

279001–279100 

|-bgcolor=#d6d6d6
| 279001 ||  || — || October 27, 2008 || Kitt Peak || Spacewatch || — || align=right | 3.5 km || 
|-id=002 bgcolor=#d6d6d6
| 279002 ||  || — || October 27, 2008 || Kitt Peak || Spacewatch || KOR || align=right | 1.5 km || 
|-id=003 bgcolor=#d6d6d6
| 279003 ||  || — || October 27, 2008 || Kitt Peak || Spacewatch || VER || align=right | 3.3 km || 
|-id=004 bgcolor=#E9E9E9
| 279004 ||  || — || October 27, 2008 || Kitt Peak || Spacewatch || — || align=right | 3.0 km || 
|-id=005 bgcolor=#d6d6d6
| 279005 ||  || — || October 27, 2008 || Kitt Peak || Spacewatch || — || align=right | 3.1 km || 
|-id=006 bgcolor=#E9E9E9
| 279006 ||  || — || October 27, 2008 || Mount Lemmon || Mount Lemmon Survey || — || align=right | 3.2 km || 
|-id=007 bgcolor=#E9E9E9
| 279007 ||  || — || October 28, 2008 || Kitt Peak || Spacewatch || — || align=right | 1.2 km || 
|-id=008 bgcolor=#d6d6d6
| 279008 ||  || — || October 28, 2008 || Mount Lemmon || Mount Lemmon Survey || — || align=right | 4.2 km || 
|-id=009 bgcolor=#E9E9E9
| 279009 ||  || — || October 28, 2008 || Mount Lemmon || Mount Lemmon Survey || — || align=right | 2.8 km || 
|-id=010 bgcolor=#d6d6d6
| 279010 ||  || — || October 28, 2008 || Kitt Peak || Spacewatch || — || align=right | 4.1 km || 
|-id=011 bgcolor=#d6d6d6
| 279011 ||  || — || October 28, 2008 || Kitt Peak || Spacewatch || — || align=right | 2.8 km || 
|-id=012 bgcolor=#E9E9E9
| 279012 ||  || — || October 28, 2008 || Mount Lemmon || Mount Lemmon Survey || — || align=right data-sort-value="0.94" | 940 m || 
|-id=013 bgcolor=#E9E9E9
| 279013 ||  || — || October 28, 2008 || Mount Lemmon || Mount Lemmon Survey || HOF || align=right | 4.9 km || 
|-id=014 bgcolor=#d6d6d6
| 279014 ||  || — || October 28, 2008 || Mount Lemmon || Mount Lemmon Survey || K-2 || align=right | 1.7 km || 
|-id=015 bgcolor=#d6d6d6
| 279015 ||  || — || October 28, 2008 || Kitt Peak || Spacewatch || — || align=right | 3.2 km || 
|-id=016 bgcolor=#d6d6d6
| 279016 ||  || — || October 29, 2008 || Kitt Peak || Spacewatch || — || align=right | 3.9 km || 
|-id=017 bgcolor=#d6d6d6
| 279017 ||  || — || October 29, 2008 || Kitt Peak || Spacewatch || — || align=right | 3.6 km || 
|-id=018 bgcolor=#E9E9E9
| 279018 ||  || — || October 29, 2008 || Kitt Peak || Spacewatch || — || align=right | 1.9 km || 
|-id=019 bgcolor=#E9E9E9
| 279019 ||  || — || October 30, 2008 || Catalina || CSS || — || align=right | 1.4 km || 
|-id=020 bgcolor=#E9E9E9
| 279020 ||  || — || October 31, 2008 || Mount Lemmon || Mount Lemmon Survey || — || align=right | 2.4 km || 
|-id=021 bgcolor=#d6d6d6
| 279021 ||  || — || October 23, 2008 || Kitt Peak || Spacewatch || — || align=right | 3.5 km || 
|-id=022 bgcolor=#d6d6d6
| 279022 ||  || — || October 23, 2008 || Kitt Peak || Spacewatch || — || align=right | 3.0 km || 
|-id=023 bgcolor=#d6d6d6
| 279023 ||  || — || October 25, 2008 || Socorro || LINEAR || — || align=right | 3.8 km || 
|-id=024 bgcolor=#d6d6d6
| 279024 ||  || — || October 30, 2008 || Kitt Peak || Spacewatch || — || align=right | 3.4 km || 
|-id=025 bgcolor=#d6d6d6
| 279025 ||  || — || October 24, 2008 || Catalina || CSS || EUP || align=right | 5.7 km || 
|-id=026 bgcolor=#d6d6d6
| 279026 ||  || — || October 28, 2008 || Kitt Peak || Spacewatch || URS || align=right | 5.9 km || 
|-id=027 bgcolor=#d6d6d6
| 279027 ||  || — || October 20, 2008 || Kitt Peak || Spacewatch || — || align=right | 3.3 km || 
|-id=028 bgcolor=#d6d6d6
| 279028 ||  || — || October 24, 2008 || Catalina || CSS || — || align=right | 3.7 km || 
|-id=029 bgcolor=#d6d6d6
| 279029 ||  || — || October 26, 2008 || Catalina || CSS || ALA || align=right | 7.7 km || 
|-id=030 bgcolor=#E9E9E9
| 279030 ||  || — || October 21, 2008 || Kitt Peak || Spacewatch || HOF || align=right | 3.3 km || 
|-id=031 bgcolor=#E9E9E9
| 279031 ||  || — || October 31, 2008 || Socorro || LINEAR || — || align=right | 1.3 km || 
|-id=032 bgcolor=#d6d6d6
| 279032 ||  || — || October 26, 2008 || Mount Lemmon || Mount Lemmon Survey || 629 || align=right | 1.9 km || 
|-id=033 bgcolor=#d6d6d6
| 279033 ||  || — || October 26, 2008 || Mount Lemmon || Mount Lemmon Survey || — || align=right | 4.6 km || 
|-id=034 bgcolor=#E9E9E9
| 279034 ||  || — || November 4, 2008 || Nazaret || G. Muler || ADE || align=right | 2.5 km || 
|-id=035 bgcolor=#E9E9E9
| 279035 Mara ||  ||  || November 7, 2008 || Nazaret || G. Muler, J. M. Ruiz || — || align=right | 2.9 km || 
|-id=036 bgcolor=#d6d6d6
| 279036 ||  || — || November 3, 2008 || Mount Lemmon || Mount Lemmon Survey || TIR || align=right | 2.8 km || 
|-id=037 bgcolor=#E9E9E9
| 279037 Utezimmer ||  ||  || November 8, 2008 || Tzec Maun || E. Schwab || — || align=right | 2.6 km || 
|-id=038 bgcolor=#d6d6d6
| 279038 ||  || — || November 1, 2008 || Mount Lemmon || Mount Lemmon Survey || — || align=right | 2.6 km || 
|-id=039 bgcolor=#d6d6d6
| 279039 ||  || — || November 1, 2008 || Mount Lemmon || Mount Lemmon Survey || — || align=right | 3.2 km || 
|-id=040 bgcolor=#d6d6d6
| 279040 ||  || — || November 1, 2008 || Kitt Peak || Spacewatch || — || align=right | 3.6 km || 
|-id=041 bgcolor=#E9E9E9
| 279041 ||  || — || November 2, 2008 || Kitt Peak || Spacewatch || — || align=right | 1.5 km || 
|-id=042 bgcolor=#d6d6d6
| 279042 ||  || — || November 2, 2008 || Mount Lemmon || Mount Lemmon Survey || — || align=right | 4.4 km || 
|-id=043 bgcolor=#E9E9E9
| 279043 ||  || — || November 2, 2008 || Mount Lemmon || Mount Lemmon Survey || — || align=right | 1.7 km || 
|-id=044 bgcolor=#d6d6d6
| 279044 ||  || — || November 2, 2008 || Mount Lemmon || Mount Lemmon Survey || — || align=right | 4.3 km || 
|-id=045 bgcolor=#E9E9E9
| 279045 ||  || — || November 3, 2008 || Kitt Peak || Spacewatch || — || align=right | 1.00 km || 
|-id=046 bgcolor=#d6d6d6
| 279046 ||  || — || November 4, 2008 || Catalina || CSS || — || align=right | 3.2 km || 
|-id=047 bgcolor=#d6d6d6
| 279047 ||  || — || November 4, 2008 || Kitt Peak || Spacewatch || — || align=right | 4.0 km || 
|-id=048 bgcolor=#fefefe
| 279048 ||  || — || November 6, 2008 || Mount Lemmon || Mount Lemmon Survey || — || align=right data-sort-value="0.73" | 730 m || 
|-id=049 bgcolor=#d6d6d6
| 279049 ||  || — || November 7, 2008 || Kitt Peak || Spacewatch || — || align=right | 4.7 km || 
|-id=050 bgcolor=#E9E9E9
| 279050 ||  || — || November 7, 2008 || Catalina || CSS || — || align=right | 1.1 km || 
|-id=051 bgcolor=#d6d6d6
| 279051 ||  || — || November 9, 2008 || La Sagra || OAM Obs. || — || align=right | 5.8 km || 
|-id=052 bgcolor=#d6d6d6
| 279052 ||  || — || November 7, 2008 || Mount Lemmon || Mount Lemmon Survey || VER || align=right | 4.7 km || 
|-id=053 bgcolor=#E9E9E9
| 279053 ||  || — || November 3, 2008 || Catalina || CSS || — || align=right | 1.0 km || 
|-id=054 bgcolor=#E9E9E9
| 279054 ||  || — || November 2, 2008 || Mount Lemmon || Mount Lemmon Survey || — || align=right | 2.9 km || 
|-id=055 bgcolor=#d6d6d6
| 279055 ||  || — || November 3, 2008 || Mount Lemmon || Mount Lemmon Survey || — || align=right | 5.7 km || 
|-id=056 bgcolor=#d6d6d6
| 279056 ||  || — || November 17, 2008 || Kitt Peak || Spacewatch || EOS || align=right | 2.1 km || 
|-id=057 bgcolor=#E9E9E9
| 279057 ||  || — || November 17, 2008 || Kitt Peak || Spacewatch || — || align=right | 1.8 km || 
|-id=058 bgcolor=#E9E9E9
| 279058 ||  || — || November 17, 2008 || Kitt Peak || Spacewatch || — || align=right | 2.5 km || 
|-id=059 bgcolor=#d6d6d6
| 279059 ||  || — || November 17, 2008 || Kitt Peak || Spacewatch || K-2 || align=right | 1.5 km || 
|-id=060 bgcolor=#E9E9E9
| 279060 ||  || — || November 17, 2008 || Kitt Peak || Spacewatch || — || align=right | 1.5 km || 
|-id=061 bgcolor=#d6d6d6
| 279061 ||  || — || November 18, 2008 || La Sagra || OAM Obs. || — || align=right | 4.4 km || 
|-id=062 bgcolor=#d6d6d6
| 279062 ||  || — || November 17, 2008 || Kitt Peak || Spacewatch || — || align=right | 2.7 km || 
|-id=063 bgcolor=#E9E9E9
| 279063 ||  || — || November 18, 2008 || La Sagra || OAM Obs. || EUN || align=right | 2.0 km || 
|-id=064 bgcolor=#d6d6d6
| 279064 ||  || — || November 18, 2008 || La Sagra || OAM Obs. || — || align=right | 4.3 km || 
|-id=065 bgcolor=#d6d6d6
| 279065 ||  || — || November 19, 2008 || Mount Lemmon || Mount Lemmon Survey || — || align=right | 3.6 km || 
|-id=066 bgcolor=#E9E9E9
| 279066 ||  || — || November 17, 2008 || Kitt Peak || Spacewatch || — || align=right | 1.1 km || 
|-id=067 bgcolor=#d6d6d6
| 279067 ||  || — || November 17, 2008 || Kitt Peak || Spacewatch || — || align=right | 4.6 km || 
|-id=068 bgcolor=#d6d6d6
| 279068 ||  || — || November 17, 2008 || Kitt Peak || Spacewatch || — || align=right | 2.5 km || 
|-id=069 bgcolor=#E9E9E9
| 279069 ||  || — || November 20, 2008 || Mount Lemmon || Mount Lemmon Survey || — || align=right | 2.8 km || 
|-id=070 bgcolor=#d6d6d6
| 279070 ||  || — || November 18, 2008 || Kitt Peak || Spacewatch || — || align=right | 3.6 km || 
|-id=071 bgcolor=#d6d6d6
| 279071 ||  || — || November 19, 2008 || Catalina || CSS || — || align=right | 3.9 km || 
|-id=072 bgcolor=#d6d6d6
| 279072 ||  || — || November 20, 2008 || Kitt Peak || Spacewatch || — || align=right | 3.5 km || 
|-id=073 bgcolor=#d6d6d6
| 279073 ||  || — || November 20, 2008 || Kitt Peak || Spacewatch || — || align=right | 3.4 km || 
|-id=074 bgcolor=#E9E9E9
| 279074 ||  || — || November 20, 2008 || Kitt Peak || Spacewatch || — || align=right | 2.4 km || 
|-id=075 bgcolor=#d6d6d6
| 279075 ||  || — || November 20, 2008 || Kitt Peak || Spacewatch || — || align=right | 3.7 km || 
|-id=076 bgcolor=#d6d6d6
| 279076 ||  || — || November 20, 2008 || Kitt Peak || Spacewatch || EOS || align=right | 3.0 km || 
|-id=077 bgcolor=#d6d6d6
| 279077 ||  || — || November 21, 2008 || Mount Lemmon || Mount Lemmon Survey || — || align=right | 3.2 km || 
|-id=078 bgcolor=#E9E9E9
| 279078 ||  || — || November 21, 2008 || Kitt Peak || Spacewatch || WIT || align=right | 1.5 km || 
|-id=079 bgcolor=#d6d6d6
| 279079 ||  || — || November 24, 2008 || Dauban || F. Kugel || — || align=right | 3.2 km || 
|-id=080 bgcolor=#d6d6d6
| 279080 ||  || — || November 19, 2008 || Catalina || CSS || EOS || align=right | 2.8 km || 
|-id=081 bgcolor=#d6d6d6
| 279081 ||  || — || November 24, 2008 || Socorro || LINEAR || EOS || align=right | 2.5 km || 
|-id=082 bgcolor=#d6d6d6
| 279082 ||  || — || November 25, 2008 || La Sagra || OAM Obs. || SYL7:4 || align=right | 4.7 km || 
|-id=083 bgcolor=#d6d6d6
| 279083 ||  || — || November 25, 2008 || La Sagra || OAM Obs. || EOS || align=right | 2.3 km || 
|-id=084 bgcolor=#d6d6d6
| 279084 ||  || — || November 30, 2008 || Kitt Peak || Spacewatch || — || align=right | 3.2 km || 
|-id=085 bgcolor=#d6d6d6
| 279085 ||  || — || November 28, 2008 || La Sagra || OAM Obs. || — || align=right | 4.0 km || 
|-id=086 bgcolor=#d6d6d6
| 279086 ||  || — || November 30, 2008 || Kitt Peak || Spacewatch || — || align=right | 3.0 km || 
|-id=087 bgcolor=#d6d6d6
| 279087 ||  || — || November 30, 2008 || Kitt Peak || Spacewatch || THM || align=right | 2.9 km || 
|-id=088 bgcolor=#d6d6d6
| 279088 ||  || — || November 30, 2008 || Kitt Peak || Spacewatch || — || align=right | 4.4 km || 
|-id=089 bgcolor=#E9E9E9
| 279089 ||  || — || November 24, 2008 || Catalina || CSS || — || align=right | 3.6 km || 
|-id=090 bgcolor=#d6d6d6
| 279090 ||  || — || November 19, 2008 || Goodricke-Pigott || R. A. Tucker || — || align=right | 5.4 km || 
|-id=091 bgcolor=#d6d6d6
| 279091 ||  || — || November 13, 2002 || Kitt Peak || Spacewatch || VER || align=right | 4.3 km || 
|-id=092 bgcolor=#d6d6d6
| 279092 ||  || — || November 26, 2008 || La Sagra || OAM Obs. || EOS || align=right | 2.9 km || 
|-id=093 bgcolor=#d6d6d6
| 279093 ||  || — || November 20, 2008 || Kitt Peak || Spacewatch || — || align=right | 3.9 km || 
|-id=094 bgcolor=#d6d6d6
| 279094 ||  || — || November 30, 2008 || Socorro || LINEAR || VER || align=right | 6.0 km || 
|-id=095 bgcolor=#d6d6d6
| 279095 ||  || — || November 30, 2008 || Socorro || LINEAR || — || align=right | 5.0 km || 
|-id=096 bgcolor=#d6d6d6
| 279096 ||  || — || December 6, 2008 || Great Shefford || P. Birtwhistle || — || align=right | 3.8 km || 
|-id=097 bgcolor=#E9E9E9
| 279097 ||  || — || December 1, 2008 || Mount Lemmon || Mount Lemmon Survey || RAF || align=right | 1.5 km || 
|-id=098 bgcolor=#E9E9E9
| 279098 ||  || — || December 1, 2008 || Catalina || CSS || — || align=right | 1.9 km || 
|-id=099 bgcolor=#d6d6d6
| 279099 ||  || — || December 26, 2008 || Dauban || F. Kugel || ELF || align=right | 4.2 km || 
|-id=100 bgcolor=#E9E9E9
| 279100 ||  || — || December 25, 2008 || Bergisch Gladbach || W. Bickel || EUN || align=right | 2.2 km || 
|}

279101–279200 

|-bgcolor=#E9E9E9
| 279101 ||  || — || December 29, 2008 || Kitt Peak || Spacewatch || — || align=right | 1.5 km || 
|-id=102 bgcolor=#d6d6d6
| 279102 ||  || — || December 29, 2008 || Kitt Peak || Spacewatch || — || align=right | 3.3 km || 
|-id=103 bgcolor=#d6d6d6
| 279103 ||  || — || December 29, 2008 || Mount Lemmon || Mount Lemmon Survey || — || align=right | 5.1 km || 
|-id=104 bgcolor=#d6d6d6
| 279104 ||  || — || December 21, 2008 || Mount Lemmon || Mount Lemmon Survey || — || align=right | 4.7 km || 
|-id=105 bgcolor=#d6d6d6
| 279105 ||  || — || January 1, 2009 || Mount Lemmon || Mount Lemmon Survey || — || align=right | 2.8 km || 
|-id=106 bgcolor=#d6d6d6
| 279106 ||  || — || January 2, 2009 || Kitt Peak || Spacewatch || — || align=right | 3.7 km || 
|-id=107 bgcolor=#d6d6d6
| 279107 ||  || — || January 3, 2009 || Kitt Peak || Spacewatch || JLI || align=right | 4.9 km || 
|-id=108 bgcolor=#d6d6d6
| 279108 ||  || — || January 25, 2009 || Kitt Peak || Spacewatch || — || align=right | 6.5 km || 
|-id=109 bgcolor=#E9E9E9
| 279109 ||  || — || January 28, 2009 || Catalina || CSS || — || align=right | 5.0 km || 
|-id=110 bgcolor=#d6d6d6
| 279110 ||  || — || February 4, 2009 || Kitt Peak || Spacewatch || HIL3:2 || align=right | 8.5 km || 
|-id=111 bgcolor=#FA8072
| 279111 ||  || — || March 18, 2009 || Catalina || CSS || H || align=right | 1.0 km || 
|-id=112 bgcolor=#E9E9E9
| 279112 ||  || — || April 16, 2009 || Kitt Peak || Spacewatch || — || align=right | 2.4 km || 
|-id=113 bgcolor=#d6d6d6
| 279113 ||  || — || April 23, 2009 || Kitt Peak || Spacewatch || — || align=right | 3.5 km || 
|-id=114 bgcolor=#E9E9E9
| 279114 ||  || — || April 23, 2009 || Kitt Peak || Spacewatch || — || align=right | 2.2 km || 
|-id=115 bgcolor=#fefefe
| 279115 ||  || — || April 21, 2009 || Mount Lemmon || Mount Lemmon Survey || — || align=right data-sort-value="0.95" | 950 m || 
|-id=116 bgcolor=#E9E9E9
| 279116 ||  || — || May 2, 2009 || La Sagra || OAM Obs. || — || align=right | 2.2 km || 
|-id=117 bgcolor=#d6d6d6
| 279117 ||  || — || May 26, 2009 || Mayhill || A. Lowe || — || align=right | 3.2 km || 
|-id=118 bgcolor=#d6d6d6
| 279118 ||  || — || November 25, 2005 || Catalina || CSS || — || align=right | 3.8 km || 
|-id=119 bgcolor=#fefefe
| 279119 Khamatova ||  ||  || July 19, 2009 || Zelenchukskaya || T. V. Kryachko || V || align=right data-sort-value="0.93" | 930 m || 
|-id=120 bgcolor=#FA8072
| 279120 ||  || — || July 26, 2009 || Siding Spring || SSS || — || align=right | 1.2 km || 
|-id=121 bgcolor=#fefefe
| 279121 ||  || — || July 27, 2009 || La Sagra || OAM Obs. || slow? || align=right | 1.2 km || 
|-id=122 bgcolor=#fefefe
| 279122 ||  || — || July 27, 2009 || Catalina || CSS || NYS || align=right data-sort-value="0.88" | 880 m || 
|-id=123 bgcolor=#fefefe
| 279123 ||  || — || August 12, 2009 || Socorro || LINEAR || CIM || align=right | 3.5 km || 
|-id=124 bgcolor=#fefefe
| 279124 ||  || — || August 15, 2009 || La Sagra || OAM Obs. || LCI || align=right | 1.5 km || 
|-id=125 bgcolor=#fefefe
| 279125 ||  || — || August 15, 2009 || Kitt Peak || Spacewatch || — || align=right | 1.1 km || 
|-id=126 bgcolor=#E9E9E9
| 279126 ||  || — || August 15, 2009 || La Sagra || OAM Obs. || — || align=right | 1.8 km || 
|-id=127 bgcolor=#fefefe
| 279127 ||  || — || August 16, 2009 || La Sagra || OAM Obs. || — || align=right data-sort-value="0.84" | 840 m || 
|-id=128 bgcolor=#fefefe
| 279128 ||  || — || August 16, 2009 || Kitt Peak || Spacewatch || V || align=right data-sort-value="0.73" | 730 m || 
|-id=129 bgcolor=#fefefe
| 279129 ||  || — || August 21, 2009 || La Sagra || OAM Obs. || — || align=right | 1.00 km || 
|-id=130 bgcolor=#fefefe
| 279130 ||  || — || August 20, 2009 || Kitt Peak || Spacewatch || — || align=right data-sort-value="0.83" | 830 m || 
|-id=131 bgcolor=#fefefe
| 279131 ||  || — || August 21, 2009 || Sandlot || G. Hug || FLO || align=right data-sort-value="0.63" | 630 m || 
|-id=132 bgcolor=#fefefe
| 279132 ||  || — || August 27, 2009 || La Sagra || OAM Obs. || FLO || align=right data-sort-value="0.79" | 790 m || 
|-id=133 bgcolor=#fefefe
| 279133 ||  || — || August 29, 2009 || Catalina || CSS || — || align=right data-sort-value="0.75" | 750 m || 
|-id=134 bgcolor=#fefefe
| 279134 ||  || — || September 10, 2009 || Catalina || CSS || V || align=right data-sort-value="0.83" | 830 m || 
|-id=135 bgcolor=#d6d6d6
| 279135 ||  || — || September 12, 2009 || Kitt Peak || Spacewatch || — || align=right | 2.2 km || 
|-id=136 bgcolor=#fefefe
| 279136 ||  || — || September 12, 2009 || Kitt Peak || Spacewatch || — || align=right data-sort-value="0.75" | 750 m || 
|-id=137 bgcolor=#fefefe
| 279137 ||  || — || September 13, 2009 || Purple Mountain || PMO NEO || — || align=right | 1.1 km || 
|-id=138 bgcolor=#fefefe
| 279138 ||  || — || September 13, 2009 || La Sagra || OAM Obs. || V || align=right data-sort-value="0.51" | 510 m || 
|-id=139 bgcolor=#E9E9E9
| 279139 ||  || — || September 15, 2009 || Kitt Peak || Spacewatch || — || align=right | 1.3 km || 
|-id=140 bgcolor=#E9E9E9
| 279140 ||  || — || September 15, 2009 || Kitt Peak || Spacewatch || — || align=right | 2.7 km || 
|-id=141 bgcolor=#fefefe
| 279141 ||  || — || September 15, 2009 || Kitt Peak || Spacewatch || — || align=right data-sort-value="0.79" | 790 m || 
|-id=142 bgcolor=#E9E9E9
| 279142 ||  || — || October 27, 2005 || Mount Lemmon || Mount Lemmon Survey || NEM || align=right | 2.5 km || 
|-id=143 bgcolor=#E9E9E9
| 279143 ||  || — || September 15, 2009 || Kitt Peak || Spacewatch || — || align=right | 1.7 km || 
|-id=144 bgcolor=#d6d6d6
| 279144 ||  || — || September 16, 2009 || Catalina || CSS || SYL7:4 || align=right | 4.9 km || 
|-id=145 bgcolor=#d6d6d6
| 279145 ||  || — || September 20, 2009 || Socorro || LINEAR || — || align=right | 5.2 km || 
|-id=146 bgcolor=#fefefe
| 279146 ||  || — || September 17, 2009 || Dauban || F. Kugel || CIM || align=right | 3.2 km || 
|-id=147 bgcolor=#E9E9E9
| 279147 ||  || — || September 16, 2009 || Kitt Peak || Spacewatch || — || align=right | 2.4 km || 
|-id=148 bgcolor=#d6d6d6
| 279148 ||  || — || September 16, 2009 || Kitt Peak || Spacewatch || — || align=right | 3.5 km || 
|-id=149 bgcolor=#fefefe
| 279149 ||  || — || September 16, 2009 || Kitt Peak || Spacewatch || NYS || align=right data-sort-value="0.74" | 740 m || 
|-id=150 bgcolor=#fefefe
| 279150 ||  || — || September 16, 2009 || Kitt Peak || Spacewatch || FLO || align=right data-sort-value="0.76" | 760 m || 
|-id=151 bgcolor=#d6d6d6
| 279151 ||  || — || September 17, 2009 || La Sagra || OAM Obs. || — || align=right | 3.6 km || 
|-id=152 bgcolor=#fefefe
| 279152 ||  || — || September 17, 2009 || Mount Lemmon || Mount Lemmon Survey || — || align=right data-sort-value="0.81" | 810 m || 
|-id=153 bgcolor=#E9E9E9
| 279153 ||  || — || September 17, 2009 || Mount Lemmon || Mount Lemmon Survey || — || align=right data-sort-value="0.87" | 870 m || 
|-id=154 bgcolor=#d6d6d6
| 279154 ||  || — || September 17, 2009 || Kitt Peak || Spacewatch || 637 || align=right | 4.1 km || 
|-id=155 bgcolor=#fefefe
| 279155 ||  || — || September 18, 2009 || Kitt Peak || Spacewatch || — || align=right | 1.3 km || 
|-id=156 bgcolor=#fefefe
| 279156 ||  || — || September 18, 2009 || Mount Lemmon || Mount Lemmon Survey || — || align=right data-sort-value="0.79" | 790 m || 
|-id=157 bgcolor=#fefefe
| 279157 ||  || — || September 18, 2009 || Kitt Peak || Spacewatch || — || align=right | 1.1 km || 
|-id=158 bgcolor=#fefefe
| 279158 ||  || — || September 18, 2009 || Kitt Peak || Spacewatch || FLO || align=right data-sort-value="0.70" | 700 m || 
|-id=159 bgcolor=#E9E9E9
| 279159 ||  || — || September 18, 2009 || Kitt Peak || Spacewatch || — || align=right | 2.2 km || 
|-id=160 bgcolor=#fefefe
| 279160 ||  || — || September 18, 2009 || Kitt Peak || Spacewatch || MAS || align=right data-sort-value="0.90" | 900 m || 
|-id=161 bgcolor=#E9E9E9
| 279161 ||  || — || September 18, 2009 || Kitt Peak || Spacewatch || HEN || align=right | 1.2 km || 
|-id=162 bgcolor=#fefefe
| 279162 ||  || — || September 18, 2009 || Kitt Peak || Spacewatch || — || align=right data-sort-value="0.85" | 850 m || 
|-id=163 bgcolor=#E9E9E9
| 279163 ||  || — || September 18, 2009 || Kitt Peak || Spacewatch || — || align=right | 1.1 km || 
|-id=164 bgcolor=#fefefe
| 279164 ||  || — || September 19, 2009 || Kitt Peak || Spacewatch || — || align=right | 1.2 km || 
|-id=165 bgcolor=#d6d6d6
| 279165 ||  || — || September 19, 2009 || Kitt Peak || Spacewatch || — || align=right | 2.7 km || 
|-id=166 bgcolor=#fefefe
| 279166 ||  || — || September 20, 2009 || Kitt Peak || Spacewatch || V || align=right data-sort-value="0.63" | 630 m || 
|-id=167 bgcolor=#E9E9E9
| 279167 ||  || — || September 20, 2009 || Kitt Peak || Spacewatch || — || align=right | 2.4 km || 
|-id=168 bgcolor=#E9E9E9
| 279168 ||  || — || September 20, 2009 || Kitt Peak || Spacewatch || — || align=right | 1.4 km || 
|-id=169 bgcolor=#E9E9E9
| 279169 ||  || — || September 22, 2009 || Kitt Peak || Spacewatch || GEF || align=right | 1.2 km || 
|-id=170 bgcolor=#fefefe
| 279170 ||  || — || September 22, 2009 || Kitt Peak || Spacewatch || NYS || align=right data-sort-value="0.61" | 610 m || 
|-id=171 bgcolor=#fefefe
| 279171 ||  || — || September 24, 2009 || Kitt Peak || Spacewatch || — || align=right data-sort-value="0.89" | 890 m || 
|-id=172 bgcolor=#E9E9E9
| 279172 ||  || — || September 18, 2009 || Catalina || CSS || MAR || align=right | 1.5 km || 
|-id=173 bgcolor=#fefefe
| 279173 ||  || — || February 1, 2003 || Haleakala || NEAT || NYS || align=right data-sort-value="0.78" | 780 m || 
|-id=174 bgcolor=#fefefe
| 279174 ||  || — || September 23, 2009 || Mount Lemmon || Mount Lemmon Survey || — || align=right data-sort-value="0.82" | 820 m || 
|-id=175 bgcolor=#fefefe
| 279175 ||  || — || September 25, 2009 || Kitt Peak || Spacewatch || FLO || align=right data-sort-value="0.70" | 700 m || 
|-id=176 bgcolor=#d6d6d6
| 279176 ||  || — || September 25, 2009 || Kitt Peak || Spacewatch || — || align=right | 2.5 km || 
|-id=177 bgcolor=#fefefe
| 279177 ||  || — || September 25, 2009 || Kitt Peak || Spacewatch || NYS || align=right data-sort-value="0.79" | 790 m || 
|-id=178 bgcolor=#E9E9E9
| 279178 ||  || — || September 25, 2009 || Kitt Peak || Spacewatch || — || align=right | 1.5 km || 
|-id=179 bgcolor=#fefefe
| 279179 ||  || — || September 25, 2009 || Kitt Peak || Spacewatch || — || align=right data-sort-value="0.67" | 670 m || 
|-id=180 bgcolor=#fefefe
| 279180 ||  || — || September 25, 2009 || Kitt Peak || Spacewatch || NYS || align=right data-sort-value="0.61" | 610 m || 
|-id=181 bgcolor=#d6d6d6
| 279181 ||  || — || September 22, 2009 || Mount Lemmon || Mount Lemmon Survey || — || align=right | 3.1 km || 
|-id=182 bgcolor=#fefefe
| 279182 ||  || — || February 17, 2004 || Kitt Peak || Spacewatch || — || align=right data-sort-value="0.78" | 780 m || 
|-id=183 bgcolor=#fefefe
| 279183 ||  || — || September 24, 2009 || Catalina || CSS || — || align=right | 1.2 km || 
|-id=184 bgcolor=#E9E9E9
| 279184 ||  || — || September 27, 2009 || Catalina || CSS || — || align=right | 1.4 km || 
|-id=185 bgcolor=#fefefe
| 279185 ||  || — || September 22, 2009 || Mount Lemmon || Mount Lemmon Survey || — || align=right | 1.0 km || 
|-id=186 bgcolor=#d6d6d6
| 279186 ||  || — || September 17, 2009 || Kitt Peak || Spacewatch || — || align=right | 2.3 km || 
|-id=187 bgcolor=#fefefe
| 279187 ||  || — || September 20, 2009 || Kitt Peak || Spacewatch || — || align=right data-sort-value="0.71" | 710 m || 
|-id=188 bgcolor=#fefefe
| 279188 ||  || — || September 20, 2009 || Mount Lemmon || Mount Lemmon Survey || V || align=right | 1.0 km || 
|-id=189 bgcolor=#fefefe
| 279189 ||  || — || September 22, 2009 || La Sagra || OAM Obs. || — || align=right | 1.2 km || 
|-id=190 bgcolor=#d6d6d6
| 279190 ||  || — || September 28, 2009 || Mount Lemmon || Mount Lemmon Survey || — || align=right | 4.3 km || 
|-id=191 bgcolor=#E9E9E9
| 279191 ||  || — || September 18, 2009 || Kitt Peak || Spacewatch || — || align=right | 3.3 km || 
|-id=192 bgcolor=#E9E9E9
| 279192 ||  || — || October 13, 2009 || Mayhill || A. Lowe || — || align=right | 2.5 km || 
|-id=193 bgcolor=#fefefe
| 279193 ||  || — || October 10, 2009 || La Sagra || OAM Obs. || — || align=right | 1.1 km || 
|-id=194 bgcolor=#fefefe
| 279194 ||  || — || October 10, 2009 || La Sagra || OAM Obs. || — || align=right data-sort-value="0.96" | 960 m || 
|-id=195 bgcolor=#fefefe
| 279195 ||  || — || October 9, 2009 || Socorro || LINEAR || — || align=right | 1.5 km || 
|-id=196 bgcolor=#fefefe
| 279196 ||  || — || October 11, 2009 || La Sagra || OAM Obs. || V || align=right data-sort-value="0.90" | 900 m || 
|-id=197 bgcolor=#fefefe
| 279197 ||  || — || October 10, 2009 || Bisei SG Center || BATTeRS || FLO || align=right data-sort-value="0.63" | 630 m || 
|-id=198 bgcolor=#d6d6d6
| 279198 ||  || — || October 15, 2009 || La Sagra || OAM Obs. || HYG || align=right | 4.9 km || 
|-id=199 bgcolor=#fefefe
| 279199 ||  || — || October 14, 2009 || Mount Lemmon || Mount Lemmon Survey || — || align=right data-sort-value="0.92" | 920 m || 
|-id=200 bgcolor=#E9E9E9
| 279200 ||  || — || October 15, 2009 || La Sagra || OAM Obs. || — || align=right | 3.1 km || 
|}

279201–279300 

|-bgcolor=#E9E9E9
| 279201 ||  || — || October 2, 2009 || Mount Lemmon || Mount Lemmon Survey || — || align=right | 2.5 km || 
|-id=202 bgcolor=#E9E9E9
| 279202 ||  || — || October 12, 2009 || Mount Lemmon || Mount Lemmon Survey || — || align=right | 2.5 km || 
|-id=203 bgcolor=#E9E9E9
| 279203 ||  || — || October 15, 2009 || Catalina || CSS || — || align=right | 1.5 km || 
|-id=204 bgcolor=#C2FFFF
| 279204 ||  || — || March 24, 2003 || Kitt Peak || Spacewatch || L4 || align=right | 11 km || 
|-id=205 bgcolor=#fefefe
| 279205 ||  || — || October 18, 2009 || Mount Lemmon || Mount Lemmon Survey || V || align=right data-sort-value="0.67" | 670 m || 
|-id=206 bgcolor=#fefefe
| 279206 ||  || — || October 18, 2009 || Mount Lemmon || Mount Lemmon Survey || V || align=right data-sort-value="0.69" | 690 m || 
|-id=207 bgcolor=#fefefe
| 279207 ||  || — || October 21, 2009 || Mount Lemmon || Mount Lemmon Survey || — || align=right data-sort-value="0.80" | 800 m || 
|-id=208 bgcolor=#E9E9E9
| 279208 ||  || — || October 21, 2009 || Mount Lemmon || Mount Lemmon Survey || slow || align=right | 1.2 km || 
|-id=209 bgcolor=#d6d6d6
| 279209 ||  || — || October 22, 2009 || Mount Lemmon || Mount Lemmon Survey || KOR || align=right | 1.5 km || 
|-id=210 bgcolor=#fefefe
| 279210 ||  || — || January 17, 2007 || Palomar || NEAT || — || align=right data-sort-value="0.99" | 990 m || 
|-id=211 bgcolor=#E9E9E9
| 279211 ||  || — || October 18, 2009 || Mount Lemmon || Mount Lemmon Survey || — || align=right | 2.1 km || 
|-id=212 bgcolor=#E9E9E9
| 279212 ||  || — || April 18, 2007 || Mount Lemmon || Mount Lemmon Survey || AST || align=right | 2.6 km || 
|-id=213 bgcolor=#fefefe
| 279213 ||  || — || October 18, 2009 || Mount Lemmon || Mount Lemmon Survey || FLO || align=right data-sort-value="0.73" | 730 m || 
|-id=214 bgcolor=#E9E9E9
| 279214 ||  || — || October 18, 2009 || Mount Lemmon || Mount Lemmon Survey || HOF || align=right | 3.2 km || 
|-id=215 bgcolor=#d6d6d6
| 279215 ||  || — || October 23, 2009 || Mount Lemmon || Mount Lemmon Survey || — || align=right | 2.9 km || 
|-id=216 bgcolor=#d6d6d6
| 279216 ||  || — || October 21, 2009 || Catalina || CSS || — || align=right | 4.1 km || 
|-id=217 bgcolor=#fefefe
| 279217 ||  || — || October 22, 2009 || Catalina || CSS || V || align=right data-sort-value="0.88" | 880 m || 
|-id=218 bgcolor=#E9E9E9
| 279218 ||  || — || October 23, 2009 || Mount Lemmon || Mount Lemmon Survey || — || align=right | 1.9 km || 
|-id=219 bgcolor=#fefefe
| 279219 ||  || — || October 23, 2009 || Mount Lemmon || Mount Lemmon Survey || — || align=right | 1.1 km || 
|-id=220 bgcolor=#E9E9E9
| 279220 ||  || — || October 24, 2009 || Kitt Peak || Spacewatch || — || align=right | 2.3 km || 
|-id=221 bgcolor=#E9E9E9
| 279221 ||  || — || October 25, 2009 || BlackBird || K. Levin || GEF || align=right | 1.5 km || 
|-id=222 bgcolor=#d6d6d6
| 279222 ||  || — || October 22, 2009 || Mount Lemmon || Mount Lemmon Survey || — || align=right | 4.9 km || 
|-id=223 bgcolor=#fefefe
| 279223 ||  || — || July 8, 2005 || Kitt Peak || Spacewatch || FLO || align=right data-sort-value="0.90" | 900 m || 
|-id=224 bgcolor=#fefefe
| 279224 ||  || — || October 23, 2009 || Mount Lemmon || Mount Lemmon Survey || — || align=right data-sort-value="0.80" | 800 m || 
|-id=225 bgcolor=#E9E9E9
| 279225 ||  || — || October 23, 2009 || Mount Lemmon || Mount Lemmon Survey || — || align=right | 1.0 km || 
|-id=226 bgcolor=#d6d6d6
| 279226 Demisroussos ||  ||  || October 24, 2009 || Zelenchukskaya || T. V. Kryachko || — || align=right | 3.1 km || 
|-id=227 bgcolor=#d6d6d6
| 279227 ||  || — || November 4, 2004 || Kitt Peak || Spacewatch || — || align=right | 3.6 km || 
|-id=228 bgcolor=#E9E9E9
| 279228 ||  || — || October 23, 2009 || Kitt Peak || Spacewatch || — || align=right | 1.1 km || 
|-id=229 bgcolor=#fefefe
| 279229 ||  || — || October 25, 2009 || Kitt Peak || Spacewatch || FLO || align=right data-sort-value="0.69" | 690 m || 
|-id=230 bgcolor=#fefefe
| 279230 ||  || — || December 17, 2003 || Kitt Peak || Spacewatch || FLO || align=right data-sort-value="0.55" | 550 m || 
|-id=231 bgcolor=#E9E9E9
| 279231 ||  || — || October 25, 2009 || Kitt Peak || Spacewatch || NEM || align=right | 2.7 km || 
|-id=232 bgcolor=#fefefe
| 279232 ||  || — || October 26, 2009 || Catalina || CSS || H || align=right data-sort-value="0.80" | 800 m || 
|-id=233 bgcolor=#d6d6d6
| 279233 ||  || — || October 27, 2009 || Mount Lemmon || Mount Lemmon Survey || EOS || align=right | 3.2 km || 
|-id=234 bgcolor=#fefefe
| 279234 ||  || — || October 22, 2009 || Catalina || CSS || FLO || align=right data-sort-value="0.91" | 910 m || 
|-id=235 bgcolor=#fefefe
| 279235 ||  || — || October 23, 2009 || Mount Lemmon || Mount Lemmon Survey || — || align=right data-sort-value="0.95" | 950 m || 
|-id=236 bgcolor=#E9E9E9
| 279236 ||  || — || October 24, 2009 || Kitt Peak || Spacewatch || — || align=right | 1.8 km || 
|-id=237 bgcolor=#E9E9E9
| 279237 ||  || — || October 23, 2009 || Kitt Peak || Spacewatch || — || align=right | 1.7 km || 
|-id=238 bgcolor=#E9E9E9
| 279238 ||  || — || October 23, 2009 || Kitt Peak || Spacewatch || — || align=right | 1.7 km || 
|-id=239 bgcolor=#d6d6d6
| 279239 ||  || — || October 25, 2009 || Mount Lemmon || Mount Lemmon Survey || HIL3:2 || align=right | 5.7 km || 
|-id=240 bgcolor=#d6d6d6
| 279240 ||  || — || November 8, 2009 || Mayhill || iTelescope Obs. || — || align=right | 4.0 km || 
|-id=241 bgcolor=#d6d6d6
| 279241 ||  || — || November 8, 2009 || Catalina || CSS || LIX || align=right | 4.1 km || 
|-id=242 bgcolor=#E9E9E9
| 279242 ||  || — || November 8, 2009 || Mount Lemmon || Mount Lemmon Survey || — || align=right | 1.7 km || 
|-id=243 bgcolor=#E9E9E9
| 279243 ||  || — || April 25, 2003 || Kitt Peak || Spacewatch || — || align=right | 1.6 km || 
|-id=244 bgcolor=#E9E9E9
| 279244 ||  || — || November 11, 2009 || Dauban || F. Kugel || — || align=right | 3.5 km || 
|-id=245 bgcolor=#E9E9E9
| 279245 ||  || — || November 10, 2009 || Mount Lemmon || Mount Lemmon Survey || — || align=right | 1.4 km || 
|-id=246 bgcolor=#d6d6d6
| 279246 ||  || — || November 10, 2009 || Mount Lemmon || Mount Lemmon Survey || — || align=right | 3.4 km || 
|-id=247 bgcolor=#d6d6d6
| 279247 ||  || — || November 10, 2009 || Mount Lemmon || Mount Lemmon Survey || — || align=right | 3.7 km || 
|-id=248 bgcolor=#fefefe
| 279248 ||  || — || November 8, 2009 || Mount Lemmon || Mount Lemmon Survey || — || align=right | 1.1 km || 
|-id=249 bgcolor=#fefefe
| 279249 ||  || — || November 9, 2009 || Mount Lemmon || Mount Lemmon Survey || V || align=right data-sort-value="0.88" | 880 m || 
|-id=250 bgcolor=#d6d6d6
| 279250 ||  || — || November 8, 2009 || Catalina || CSS || HYG || align=right | 4.4 km || 
|-id=251 bgcolor=#E9E9E9
| 279251 ||  || — || November 12, 2009 || Needville || J. Dellinger, M. Eastman || — || align=right | 2.4 km || 
|-id=252 bgcolor=#fefefe
| 279252 ||  || — || November 14, 2009 || Plana || F. Fratev || — || align=right data-sort-value="0.88" | 880 m || 
|-id=253 bgcolor=#E9E9E9
| 279253 ||  || — || November 11, 2009 || Socorro || LINEAR || HOF || align=right | 3.5 km || 
|-id=254 bgcolor=#d6d6d6
| 279254 ||  || — || November 9, 2009 || Catalina || CSS || CHA || align=right | 2.2 km || 
|-id=255 bgcolor=#fefefe
| 279255 ||  || — || November 9, 2009 || Mount Lemmon || Mount Lemmon Survey || — || align=right data-sort-value="0.93" | 930 m || 
|-id=256 bgcolor=#E9E9E9
| 279256 ||  || — || November 10, 2009 || Kitt Peak || Spacewatch || BAR || align=right | 1.4 km || 
|-id=257 bgcolor=#d6d6d6
| 279257 ||  || — || November 10, 2009 || Kitt Peak || Spacewatch || — || align=right | 3.7 km || 
|-id=258 bgcolor=#E9E9E9
| 279258 ||  || — || November 11, 2009 || Mount Lemmon || Mount Lemmon Survey || — || align=right data-sort-value="0.97" | 970 m || 
|-id=259 bgcolor=#E9E9E9
| 279259 ||  || — || November 8, 2009 || Kitt Peak || Spacewatch || — || align=right data-sort-value="0.93" | 930 m || 
|-id=260 bgcolor=#fefefe
| 279260 ||  || — || September 29, 2005 || Kitt Peak || Spacewatch || — || align=right | 1.0 km || 
|-id=261 bgcolor=#E9E9E9
| 279261 ||  || — || February 23, 2007 || Catalina || CSS || — || align=right | 1.7 km || 
|-id=262 bgcolor=#fefefe
| 279262 ||  || — || November 11, 2009 || Kitt Peak || Spacewatch || FLO || align=right data-sort-value="0.79" | 790 m || 
|-id=263 bgcolor=#fefefe
| 279263 ||  || — || November 11, 2009 || Mount Lemmon || Mount Lemmon Survey || — || align=right | 1.7 km || 
|-id=264 bgcolor=#fefefe
| 279264 ||  || — || November 9, 2009 || Catalina || CSS || — || align=right | 1.0 km || 
|-id=265 bgcolor=#d6d6d6
| 279265 ||  || — || November 10, 2009 || Kitt Peak || Spacewatch || SHU3:2 || align=right | 5.1 km || 
|-id=266 bgcolor=#fefefe
| 279266 ||  || — || November 8, 2009 || Mount Lemmon || Mount Lemmon Survey || — || align=right | 1.1 km || 
|-id=267 bgcolor=#E9E9E9
| 279267 ||  || — || November 11, 2009 || Mount Lemmon || Mount Lemmon Survey || — || align=right | 1.3 km || 
|-id=268 bgcolor=#E9E9E9
| 279268 ||  || — || November 9, 2009 || Catalina || CSS || — || align=right | 1.9 km || 
|-id=269 bgcolor=#d6d6d6
| 279269 ||  || — || November 10, 2009 || Mount Lemmon || Mount Lemmon Survey || — || align=right | 4.7 km || 
|-id=270 bgcolor=#E9E9E9
| 279270 ||  || — || November 9, 2009 || Kitt Peak || Spacewatch || — || align=right | 2.9 km || 
|-id=271 bgcolor=#E9E9E9
| 279271 ||  || — || November 11, 2009 || Mount Lemmon || Mount Lemmon Survey || MRX || align=right | 1.3 km || 
|-id=272 bgcolor=#fefefe
| 279272 ||  || — || November 8, 2009 || Mount Lemmon || Mount Lemmon Survey || — || align=right data-sort-value="0.81" | 810 m || 
|-id=273 bgcolor=#fefefe
| 279273 ||  || — || November 17, 2009 || Kachina || J. Hobart || — || align=right | 1.2 km || 
|-id=274 bgcolor=#d6d6d6
| 279274 Shurpakov ||  ||  || November 19, 2009 || Tzec Maun || V. Nevski || — || align=right | 2.3 km || 
|-id=275 bgcolor=#E9E9E9
| 279275 ||  || — || November 18, 2009 || Socorro || LINEAR || RAF || align=right | 1.3 km || 
|-id=276 bgcolor=#fefefe
| 279276 ||  || — || November 16, 2009 || Mount Lemmon || Mount Lemmon Survey || FLO || align=right data-sort-value="0.63" | 630 m || 
|-id=277 bgcolor=#fefefe
| 279277 ||  || — || November 16, 2009 || Mount Lemmon || Mount Lemmon Survey || — || align=right data-sort-value="0.82" | 820 m || 
|-id=278 bgcolor=#d6d6d6
| 279278 ||  || — || November 16, 2009 || Kitt Peak || Spacewatch || EOS || align=right | 2.7 km || 
|-id=279 bgcolor=#E9E9E9
| 279279 ||  || — || November 16, 2009 || Kitt Peak || Spacewatch || — || align=right | 3.4 km || 
|-id=280 bgcolor=#fefefe
| 279280 ||  || — || November 16, 2009 || Mount Lemmon || Mount Lemmon Survey || NYS || align=right | 1.8 km || 
|-id=281 bgcolor=#fefefe
| 279281 ||  || — || November 16, 2009 || Kitt Peak || Spacewatch || — || align=right data-sort-value="0.88" | 880 m || 
|-id=282 bgcolor=#C2FFFF
| 279282 ||  || — || September 7, 2008 || Mount Lemmon || Mount Lemmon Survey || L4 || align=right | 9.9 km || 
|-id=283 bgcolor=#d6d6d6
| 279283 ||  || — || November 17, 2009 || Kitt Peak || Spacewatch || KOR || align=right | 1.6 km || 
|-id=284 bgcolor=#fefefe
| 279284 ||  || — || December 12, 2006 || Kitt Peak || Spacewatch || FLO || align=right data-sort-value="0.67" | 670 m || 
|-id=285 bgcolor=#d6d6d6
| 279285 ||  || — || November 17, 2009 || Socorro || LINEAR || — || align=right | 4.0 km || 
|-id=286 bgcolor=#E9E9E9
| 279286 ||  || — || November 18, 2009 || Kitt Peak || Spacewatch || — || align=right | 3.4 km || 
|-id=287 bgcolor=#d6d6d6
| 279287 ||  || — || November 18, 2009 || Kitt Peak || Spacewatch || 7:4 || align=right | 4.4 km || 
|-id=288 bgcolor=#fefefe
| 279288 ||  || — || November 18, 2009 || La Sagra || OAM Obs. || KLI || align=right | 2.6 km || 
|-id=289 bgcolor=#d6d6d6
| 279289 ||  || — || November 21, 2009 || Kitt Peak || Spacewatch || — || align=right | 3.3 km || 
|-id=290 bgcolor=#d6d6d6
| 279290 ||  || — || November 22, 2009 || Kitt Peak || Spacewatch || — || align=right | 3.1 km || 
|-id=291 bgcolor=#d6d6d6
| 279291 ||  || — || November 20, 2009 || La Sagra || OAM Obs. || EOS || align=right | 3.1 km || 
|-id=292 bgcolor=#fefefe
| 279292 ||  || — || November 17, 2009 || Mount Lemmon || Mount Lemmon Survey || MAS || align=right data-sort-value="0.82" | 820 m || 
|-id=293 bgcolor=#d6d6d6
| 279293 ||  || — || November 20, 2009 || Kitt Peak || Spacewatch || KOR || align=right | 1.5 km || 
|-id=294 bgcolor=#fefefe
| 279294 ||  || — || November 20, 2009 || Kitt Peak || Spacewatch || V || align=right data-sort-value="0.90" | 900 m || 
|-id=295 bgcolor=#d6d6d6
| 279295 ||  || — || January 7, 2006 || Mount Lemmon || Mount Lemmon Survey || — || align=right | 2.5 km || 
|-id=296 bgcolor=#d6d6d6
| 279296 ||  || — || November 18, 2009 || Mount Lemmon || Mount Lemmon Survey || — || align=right | 3.9 km || 
|-id=297 bgcolor=#E9E9E9
| 279297 ||  || — || September 15, 2004 || Kitt Peak || Spacewatch || — || align=right | 1.8 km || 
|-id=298 bgcolor=#d6d6d6
| 279298 ||  || — || November 19, 2009 || Catalina || CSS || — || align=right | 2.6 km || 
|-id=299 bgcolor=#E9E9E9
| 279299 ||  || — || November 21, 2009 || Kitt Peak || Spacewatch || — || align=right | 2.4 km || 
|-id=300 bgcolor=#fefefe
| 279300 ||  || — || November 23, 2009 || Kitt Peak || Spacewatch || — || align=right data-sort-value="0.85" | 850 m || 
|}

279301–279400 

|-bgcolor=#E9E9E9
| 279301 ||  || — || November 23, 2009 || Kitt Peak || Spacewatch || — || align=right | 3.2 km || 
|-id=302 bgcolor=#d6d6d6
| 279302 ||  || — || December 16, 1999 || Kitt Peak || Spacewatch || — || align=right | 2.4 km || 
|-id=303 bgcolor=#E9E9E9
| 279303 ||  || — || November 24, 2009 || Mount Lemmon || Mount Lemmon Survey || MAR || align=right | 1.3 km || 
|-id=304 bgcolor=#d6d6d6
| 279304 ||  || — || November 24, 2009 || Mount Lemmon || Mount Lemmon Survey || — || align=right | 2.3 km || 
|-id=305 bgcolor=#E9E9E9
| 279305 ||  || — || November 24, 2009 || Kitt Peak || Spacewatch || — || align=right | 1.7 km || 
|-id=306 bgcolor=#d6d6d6
| 279306 ||  || — || November 16, 2009 || Kitt Peak || Spacewatch || — || align=right | 3.2 km || 
|-id=307 bgcolor=#E9E9E9
| 279307 ||  || — || November 17, 2009 || Kitt Peak || Spacewatch || — || align=right | 1.5 km || 
|-id=308 bgcolor=#d6d6d6
| 279308 ||  || — || November 20, 2009 || Mount Lemmon || Mount Lemmon Survey || 7:4 || align=right | 5.1 km || 
|-id=309 bgcolor=#fefefe
| 279309 ||  || — || February 23, 2007 || Catalina || CSS || V || align=right data-sort-value="0.90" | 900 m || 
|-id=310 bgcolor=#E9E9E9
| 279310 ||  || — || November 17, 2009 || Mount Lemmon || Mount Lemmon Survey || — || align=right | 2.6 km || 
|-id=311 bgcolor=#d6d6d6
| 279311 ||  || — || November 24, 2009 || Kitt Peak || Spacewatch || — || align=right | 4.2 km || 
|-id=312 bgcolor=#E9E9E9
| 279312 ||  || — || November 21, 2009 || Mount Lemmon || Mount Lemmon Survey || PAD || align=right | 2.2 km || 
|-id=313 bgcolor=#E9E9E9
| 279313 ||  || — || November 16, 2009 || Mount Lemmon || Mount Lemmon Survey || — || align=right | 1.1 km || 
|-id=314 bgcolor=#E9E9E9
| 279314 ||  || — || November 16, 2009 || Socorro || LINEAR || — || align=right | 3.1 km || 
|-id=315 bgcolor=#E9E9E9
| 279315 ||  || — || November 17, 2009 || Kitt Peak || Spacewatch || — || align=right | 3.0 km || 
|-id=316 bgcolor=#E9E9E9
| 279316 ||  || — || November 17, 2009 || Mount Lemmon || Mount Lemmon Survey || — || align=right | 3.1 km || 
|-id=317 bgcolor=#E9E9E9
| 279317 ||  || — || December 10, 2009 || Mayhill || iTelescope Obs. || — || align=right | 4.3 km || 
|-id=318 bgcolor=#d6d6d6
| 279318 ||  || — || December 10, 2009 || Mount Lemmon || Mount Lemmon Survey || THM || align=right | 2.7 km || 
|-id=319 bgcolor=#d6d6d6
| 279319 ||  || — || December 14, 2009 || Mayhill || A. Lowe || TIR || align=right | 4.8 km || 
|-id=320 bgcolor=#fefefe
| 279320 ||  || — || December 16, 2006 || Mount Lemmon || Mount Lemmon Survey || FLO || align=right data-sort-value="0.71" | 710 m || 
|-id=321 bgcolor=#E9E9E9
| 279321 ||  || — || December 10, 2009 || Mount Lemmon || Mount Lemmon Survey || MRX || align=right | 1.6 km || 
|-id=322 bgcolor=#d6d6d6
| 279322 ||  || — || December 13, 2009 || Mount Lemmon || Mount Lemmon Survey || EOS || align=right | 4.4 km || 
|-id=323 bgcolor=#d6d6d6
| 279323 ||  || — || December 15, 2009 || Mount Lemmon || Mount Lemmon Survey || — || align=right | 5.1 km || 
|-id=324 bgcolor=#d6d6d6
| 279324 ||  || — || December 15, 2009 || Mount Lemmon || Mount Lemmon Survey || — || align=right | 3.0 km || 
|-id=325 bgcolor=#E9E9E9
| 279325 ||  || — || December 15, 2009 || Mount Lemmon || Mount Lemmon Survey || — || align=right | 2.2 km || 
|-id=326 bgcolor=#fefefe
| 279326 ||  || — || December 15, 2009 || Mount Lemmon || Mount Lemmon Survey || V || align=right data-sort-value="0.81" | 810 m || 
|-id=327 bgcolor=#E9E9E9
| 279327 ||  || — || December 15, 2009 || Mount Lemmon || Mount Lemmon Survey || — || align=right | 3.4 km || 
|-id=328 bgcolor=#E9E9E9
| 279328 ||  || — || December 15, 2009 || Mount Lemmon || Mount Lemmon Survey || — || align=right | 2.4 km || 
|-id=329 bgcolor=#d6d6d6
| 279329 ||  || — || December 15, 2009 || Mount Lemmon || Mount Lemmon Survey || — || align=right | 2.6 km || 
|-id=330 bgcolor=#E9E9E9
| 279330 ||  || — || December 15, 2009 || Mount Lemmon || Mount Lemmon Survey || — || align=right | 1.6 km || 
|-id=331 bgcolor=#d6d6d6
| 279331 ||  || — || December 15, 2009 || Mount Lemmon || Mount Lemmon Survey || KOR || align=right | 1.4 km || 
|-id=332 bgcolor=#d6d6d6
| 279332 ||  || — || December 15, 2009 || Mount Lemmon || Mount Lemmon Survey || KOR || align=right | 1.4 km || 
|-id=333 bgcolor=#d6d6d6
| 279333 ||  || — || December 15, 2009 || Mount Lemmon || Mount Lemmon Survey || KOR || align=right | 1.4 km || 
|-id=334 bgcolor=#E9E9E9
| 279334 ||  || — || December 10, 2009 || Mount Lemmon || Mount Lemmon Survey || KON || align=right | 2.4 km || 
|-id=335 bgcolor=#E9E9E9
| 279335 ||  || — || December 15, 2009 || Mount Lemmon || Mount Lemmon Survey || GEF || align=right | 1.8 km || 
|-id=336 bgcolor=#d6d6d6
| 279336 || 2009 YL || — || December 17, 2009 || Hibiscus || N. Teamo || — || align=right | 3.0 km || 
|-id=337 bgcolor=#E9E9E9
| 279337 ||  || — || December 17, 2009 || Mount Lemmon || Mount Lemmon Survey || — || align=right | 2.9 km || 
|-id=338 bgcolor=#d6d6d6
| 279338 ||  || — || December 17, 2009 || Kitt Peak || Spacewatch || — || align=right | 4.2 km || 
|-id=339 bgcolor=#d6d6d6
| 279339 ||  || — || December 18, 2009 || Hibiscus || N. Teamo || — || align=right | 3.7 km || 
|-id=340 bgcolor=#d6d6d6
| 279340 ||  || — || December 17, 2009 || Tzec Maun || D. Chestnov, A. Novichonok || — || align=right | 2.4 km || 
|-id=341 bgcolor=#fefefe
| 279341 ||  || — || December 16, 2009 || Kitt Peak || Spacewatch || — || align=right data-sort-value="0.99" | 990 m || 
|-id=342 bgcolor=#d6d6d6
| 279342 ||  || — || December 16, 2009 || Mount Lemmon || Mount Lemmon Survey || EOS || align=right | 3.1 km || 
|-id=343 bgcolor=#E9E9E9
| 279343 ||  || — || December 17, 2009 || Mount Lemmon || Mount Lemmon Survey || — || align=right | 3.1 km || 
|-id=344 bgcolor=#d6d6d6
| 279344 ||  || — || December 18, 2009 || Mount Lemmon || Mount Lemmon Survey || — || align=right | 2.7 km || 
|-id=345 bgcolor=#d6d6d6
| 279345 ||  || — || December 18, 2009 || Mount Lemmon || Mount Lemmon Survey || EOS || align=right | 2.6 km || 
|-id=346 bgcolor=#d6d6d6
| 279346 ||  || — || December 25, 2009 || Kitt Peak || Spacewatch || — || align=right | 2.6 km || 
|-id=347 bgcolor=#E9E9E9
| 279347 ||  || — || August 23, 2008 || Siding Spring || SSS || — || align=right | 2.4 km || 
|-id=348 bgcolor=#d6d6d6
| 279348 ||  || — || December 17, 2009 || Kitt Peak || Spacewatch || — || align=right | 4.4 km || 
|-id=349 bgcolor=#E9E9E9
| 279349 ||  || — || January 7, 2010 || Bisei SG Center || BATTeRS || — || align=right | 1.2 km || 
|-id=350 bgcolor=#E9E9E9
| 279350 ||  || — || January 6, 2010 || Kitt Peak || Spacewatch || WIT || align=right | 1.3 km || 
|-id=351 bgcolor=#E9E9E9
| 279351 ||  || — || January 6, 2010 || Mount Lemmon || Mount Lemmon Survey || — || align=right | 3.4 km || 
|-id=352 bgcolor=#E9E9E9
| 279352 ||  || — || January 6, 2010 || Catalina || CSS || — || align=right | 2.3 km || 
|-id=353 bgcolor=#E9E9E9
| 279353 ||  || — || January 7, 2010 || Mount Lemmon || Mount Lemmon Survey || AGN || align=right | 1.4 km || 
|-id=354 bgcolor=#E9E9E9
| 279354 ||  || — || January 7, 2010 || Catalina || CSS || DOR || align=right | 3.9 km || 
|-id=355 bgcolor=#E9E9E9
| 279355 ||  || — || January 6, 2010 || Kitt Peak || Spacewatch || — || align=right | 2.4 km || 
|-id=356 bgcolor=#E9E9E9
| 279356 ||  || — || January 7, 2010 || Kitt Peak || Spacewatch || — || align=right | 2.3 km || 
|-id=357 bgcolor=#fefefe
| 279357 ||  || — || January 7, 2010 || Kitt Peak || Spacewatch || V || align=right data-sort-value="0.80" | 800 m || 
|-id=358 bgcolor=#E9E9E9
| 279358 ||  || — || January 7, 2010 || Kitt Peak || Spacewatch || — || align=right | 1.8 km || 
|-id=359 bgcolor=#d6d6d6
| 279359 ||  || — || January 8, 2010 || Kitt Peak || Spacewatch || 7:4 || align=right | 3.8 km || 
|-id=360 bgcolor=#d6d6d6
| 279360 ||  || — || January 8, 2010 || Kitt Peak || Spacewatch || — || align=right | 3.4 km || 
|-id=361 bgcolor=#E9E9E9
| 279361 ||  || — || January 6, 2010 || Catalina || CSS || — || align=right | 1.9 km || 
|-id=362 bgcolor=#E9E9E9
| 279362 ||  || — || January 6, 2010 || Catalina || CSS || — || align=right | 2.4 km || 
|-id=363 bgcolor=#d6d6d6
| 279363 ||  || — || January 6, 2010 || Catalina || CSS || — || align=right | 2.7 km || 
|-id=364 bgcolor=#E9E9E9
| 279364 ||  || — || January 13, 2010 || Hawkeye || Hawkeye Obs. || — || align=right | 2.5 km || 
|-id=365 bgcolor=#d6d6d6
| 279365 ||  || — || January 10, 2010 || Socorro || LINEAR || — || align=right | 3.8 km || 
|-id=366 bgcolor=#d6d6d6
| 279366 ||  || — || December 20, 2009 || Kitt Peak || Spacewatch || VER || align=right | 3.8 km || 
|-id=367 bgcolor=#d6d6d6
| 279367 ||  || — || June 30, 2001 || Palomar || NEAT || — || align=right | 4.8 km || 
|-id=368 bgcolor=#d6d6d6
| 279368 ||  || — || January 13, 2010 || Mount Lemmon || Mount Lemmon Survey || VER || align=right | 3.5 km || 
|-id=369 bgcolor=#E9E9E9
| 279369 ||  || — || January 15, 2010 || Catalina || CSS || — || align=right | 3.9 km || 
|-id=370 bgcolor=#E9E9E9
| 279370 ||  || — || January 15, 2010 || Catalina || CSS || — || align=right | 2.3 km || 
|-id=371 bgcolor=#E9E9E9
| 279371 ||  || — || January 10, 2010 || Socorro || LINEAR || — || align=right | 2.3 km || 
|-id=372 bgcolor=#E9E9E9
| 279372 ||  || — || January 13, 2010 || Bisei SG Center || BATTeRS || — || align=right | 2.5 km || 
|-id=373 bgcolor=#d6d6d6
| 279373 ||  || — || January 13, 2010 || Kitt Peak || Spacewatch || VER || align=right | 4.3 km || 
|-id=374 bgcolor=#d6d6d6
| 279374 ||  || — || January 13, 2010 || Mount Lemmon || Mount Lemmon Survey || HYG || align=right | 4.0 km || 
|-id=375 bgcolor=#d6d6d6
| 279375 ||  || — || January 8, 2010 || Kitt Peak || Spacewatch || — || align=right | 4.0 km || 
|-id=376 bgcolor=#d6d6d6
| 279376 ||  || — || October 14, 2001 || Kitt Peak || Spacewatch || 3:2 || align=right | 4.2 km || 
|-id=377 bgcolor=#d6d6d6
| 279377 Lechmankiewicz ||  ||  || February 7, 2010 || Westfield || ARO || — || align=right | 3.3 km || 
|-id=378 bgcolor=#d6d6d6
| 279378 ||  || — || February 5, 2010 || Kitt Peak || Spacewatch || — || align=right | 3.3 km || 
|-id=379 bgcolor=#d6d6d6
| 279379 ||  || — || February 7, 2010 || La Sagra || OAM Obs. || HYG || align=right | 4.2 km || 
|-id=380 bgcolor=#d6d6d6
| 279380 ||  || — || May 9, 2006 || Mount Lemmon || Mount Lemmon Survey || — || align=right | 6.0 km || 
|-id=381 bgcolor=#d6d6d6
| 279381 ||  || — || February 6, 2010 || Mount Lemmon || Mount Lemmon Survey || — || align=right | 4.5 km || 
|-id=382 bgcolor=#d6d6d6
| 279382 ||  || — || February 5, 2010 || Catalina || CSS || — || align=right | 2.9 km || 
|-id=383 bgcolor=#d6d6d6
| 279383 ||  || — || February 14, 2010 || Socorro || LINEAR || — || align=right | 5.8 km || 
|-id=384 bgcolor=#d6d6d6
| 279384 ||  || — || February 14, 2010 || Socorro || LINEAR || — || align=right | 4.7 km || 
|-id=385 bgcolor=#d6d6d6
| 279385 ||  || — || February 9, 2010 || Catalina || CSS || — || align=right | 5.1 km || 
|-id=386 bgcolor=#d6d6d6
| 279386 ||  || — || February 13, 2010 || Mount Lemmon || Mount Lemmon Survey || — || align=right | 2.2 km || 
|-id=387 bgcolor=#d6d6d6
| 279387 ||  || — || February 13, 2010 || Mount Lemmon || Mount Lemmon Survey || SYL7:4 || align=right | 7.1 km || 
|-id=388 bgcolor=#E9E9E9
| 279388 ||  || — || February 14, 2010 || Mount Lemmon || Mount Lemmon Survey || — || align=right | 3.1 km || 
|-id=389 bgcolor=#d6d6d6
| 279389 ||  || — || February 15, 2010 || Catalina || CSS || — || align=right | 4.5 km || 
|-id=390 bgcolor=#E9E9E9
| 279390 ||  || — || February 9, 2010 || Mount Lemmon || Mount Lemmon Survey || — || align=right | 2.7 km || 
|-id=391 bgcolor=#E9E9E9
| 279391 ||  || — || February 14, 2010 || Catalina || CSS || — || align=right | 2.2 km || 
|-id=392 bgcolor=#d6d6d6
| 279392 ||  || — || February 14, 2010 || Mount Lemmon || Mount Lemmon Survey || — || align=right | 4.4 km || 
|-id=393 bgcolor=#d6d6d6
| 279393 ||  || — || February 5, 2010 || Catalina || CSS || — || align=right | 3.1 km || 
|-id=394 bgcolor=#E9E9E9
| 279394 ||  || — || February 10, 2010 || Kitt Peak || Spacewatch || POS || align=right | 5.7 km || 
|-id=395 bgcolor=#d6d6d6
| 279395 ||  || — || February 13, 2010 || Catalina || CSS || — || align=right | 4.5 km || 
|-id=396 bgcolor=#d6d6d6
| 279396 ||  || — || February 17, 2010 || Socorro || LINEAR || — || align=right | 3.7 km || 
|-id=397 bgcolor=#d6d6d6
| 279397 Dombeck ||  ||  || February 16, 2010 || Haleakala || Pan-STARRS || — || align=right | 2.8 km || 
|-id=398 bgcolor=#E9E9E9
| 279398 ||  || — || March 4, 2010 || Dauban || F. Kugel || — || align=right | 3.1 km || 
|-id=399 bgcolor=#fefefe
| 279399 ||  || — || March 5, 2010 || Kitt Peak || Spacewatch || — || align=right data-sort-value="0.91" | 910 m || 
|-id=400 bgcolor=#fefefe
| 279400 ||  || — || March 12, 2010 || Mount Lemmon || Mount Lemmon Survey || — || align=right data-sort-value="0.85" | 850 m || 
|}

279401–279500 

|-bgcolor=#E9E9E9
| 279401 ||  || — || March 12, 2010 || Kitt Peak || Spacewatch || — || align=right | 2.2 km || 
|-id=402 bgcolor=#E9E9E9
| 279402 ||  || — || March 5, 2010 || Kitt Peak || Spacewatch || DOR || align=right | 3.3 km || 
|-id=403 bgcolor=#d6d6d6
| 279403 ||  || — || March 13, 2010 || Dauban || F. Kugel || — || align=right | 3.8 km || 
|-id=404 bgcolor=#E9E9E9
| 279404 ||  || — || March 12, 2010 || Kitt Peak || Spacewatch || — || align=right | 1.7 km || 
|-id=405 bgcolor=#d6d6d6
| 279405 ||  || — || March 13, 2010 || Catalina || CSS || — || align=right | 5.1 km || 
|-id=406 bgcolor=#E9E9E9
| 279406 ||  || — || March 13, 2010 || Kitt Peak || Spacewatch || ADE || align=right | 3.6 km || 
|-id=407 bgcolor=#E9E9E9
| 279407 ||  || — || March 14, 2010 || La Sagra || OAM Obs. || — || align=right | 3.2 km || 
|-id=408 bgcolor=#d6d6d6
| 279408 ||  || — || March 15, 2010 || Kitt Peak || Spacewatch || MRC || align=right | 2.8 km || 
|-id=409 bgcolor=#E9E9E9
| 279409 ||  || — || March 12, 2010 || Catalina || CSS || — || align=right | 2.6 km || 
|-id=410 bgcolor=#fefefe
| 279410 McCallon ||  ||  || March 1, 2010 || WISE || WISE || — || align=right | 2.5 km || 
|-id=411 bgcolor=#d6d6d6
| 279411 ||  || — || March 16, 2010 || Vallemare di Borbona || V. S. Casulli || — || align=right | 4.1 km || 
|-id=412 bgcolor=#d6d6d6
| 279412 ||  || — || March 17, 2010 || Kitt Peak || Spacewatch || — || align=right | 3.4 km || 
|-id=413 bgcolor=#fefefe
| 279413 ||  || — || March 18, 2010 || Mount Lemmon || Mount Lemmon Survey || FLO || align=right | 1.3 km || 
|-id=414 bgcolor=#d6d6d6
| 279414 ||  || — || March 25, 2010 || Kitt Peak || Spacewatch || HYG || align=right | 3.1 km || 
|-id=415 bgcolor=#d6d6d6
| 279415 ||  || — || April 4, 2010 || Jarnac || Jarnac Obs. || — || align=right | 5.1 km || 
|-id=416 bgcolor=#fefefe
| 279416 ||  || — || April 1, 2010 || WISE || WISE || NYS || align=right | 1.5 km || 
|-id=417 bgcolor=#fefefe
| 279417 ||  || — || April 8, 2010 || Kitt Peak || Spacewatch || FLO || align=right data-sort-value="0.87" | 870 m || 
|-id=418 bgcolor=#d6d6d6
| 279418 ||  || — || September 13, 2007 || Mount Lemmon || Mount Lemmon Survey || — || align=right | 4.6 km || 
|-id=419 bgcolor=#E9E9E9
| 279419 ||  || — || April 9, 2010 || Kitt Peak || Spacewatch || — || align=right | 3.1 km || 
|-id=420 bgcolor=#d6d6d6
| 279420 ||  || — || April 7, 2010 || Mount Lemmon || Mount Lemmon Survey || — || align=right | 2.9 km || 
|-id=421 bgcolor=#d6d6d6
| 279421 ||  || — || September 4, 2007 || Mount Lemmon || Mount Lemmon Survey || — || align=right | 4.9 km || 
|-id=422 bgcolor=#fefefe
| 279422 ||  || — || April 5, 2010 || Kitt Peak || Spacewatch || — || align=right | 2.2 km || 
|-id=423 bgcolor=#d6d6d6
| 279423 ||  || — || April 19, 2010 || WISE || WISE || — || align=right | 5.2 km || 
|-id=424 bgcolor=#d6d6d6
| 279424 ||  || — || May 5, 2010 || Mount Lemmon || Mount Lemmon Survey || — || align=right | 3.2 km || 
|-id=425 bgcolor=#fefefe
| 279425 ||  || — || May 30, 2010 || WISE || WISE || ERI || align=right | 2.8 km || 
|-id=426 bgcolor=#fefefe
| 279426 ||  || — || June 16, 2010 || WISE || WISE || — || align=right | 1.3 km || 
|-id=427 bgcolor=#E9E9E9
| 279427 ||  || — || October 15, 2001 || Palomar || NEAT || — || align=right | 3.3 km || 
|-id=428 bgcolor=#d6d6d6
| 279428 ||  || — || March 10, 2008 || Kitt Peak || Spacewatch || — || align=right | 4.5 km || 
|-id=429 bgcolor=#d6d6d6
| 279429 ||  || — || October 28, 2005 || Catalina || CSS || — || align=right | 3.5 km || 
|-id=430 bgcolor=#d6d6d6
| 279430 ||  || — || November 9, 2005 || Catalina || CSS || EOS || align=right | 2.9 km || 
|-id=431 bgcolor=#d6d6d6
| 279431 ||  || — || November 21, 2005 || Catalina || CSS || — || align=right | 3.9 km || 
|-id=432 bgcolor=#E9E9E9
| 279432 ||  || — || July 11, 2010 || WISE || WISE || — || align=right | 2.7 km || 
|-id=433 bgcolor=#d6d6d6
| 279433 ||  || — || July 14, 2010 || WISE || WISE || — || align=right | 4.0 km || 
|-id=434 bgcolor=#d6d6d6
| 279434 ||  || — || October 5, 2002 || Socorro || LINEAR || HIL3:2 || align=right | 7.3 km || 
|-id=435 bgcolor=#d6d6d6
| 279435 ||  || — || May 5, 2008 || Mount Lemmon || Mount Lemmon Survey || HIL3:2 || align=right | 5.7 km || 
|-id=436 bgcolor=#d6d6d6
| 279436 ||  || — || March 11, 2002 || Palomar || NEAT || VER || align=right | 5.9 km || 
|-id=437 bgcolor=#d6d6d6
| 279437 ||  || — || July 16, 2010 || WISE || WISE || — || align=right | 4.1 km || 
|-id=438 bgcolor=#d6d6d6
| 279438 ||  || — || July 18, 2010 || WISE || WISE || — || align=right | 4.0 km || 
|-id=439 bgcolor=#d6d6d6
| 279439 ||  || — || October 13, 1999 || Socorro || LINEAR || — || align=right | 4.3 km || 
|-id=440 bgcolor=#E9E9E9
| 279440 ||  || — || April 5, 2003 || Kitt Peak || Spacewatch || — || align=right | 2.2 km || 
|-id=441 bgcolor=#fefefe
| 279441 ||  || — || July 25, 2003 || Palomar || NEAT || FLO || align=right data-sort-value="0.77" | 770 m || 
|-id=442 bgcolor=#E9E9E9
| 279442 ||  || — || October 14, 2001 || Cima Ekar || ADAS || — || align=right | 3.2 km || 
|-id=443 bgcolor=#fefefe
| 279443 ||  || — || September 29, 1995 || Kitt Peak || Spacewatch || — || align=right | 1.2 km || 
|-id=444 bgcolor=#d6d6d6
| 279444 ||  || — || October 30, 2006 || Mount Lemmon || Mount Lemmon Survey || EOS || align=right | 2.2 km || 
|-id=445 bgcolor=#d6d6d6
| 279445 ||  || — || October 27, 2005 || Catalina || CSS || EOS || align=right | 2.2 km || 
|-id=446 bgcolor=#fefefe
| 279446 ||  || — || October 22, 2003 || Kitt Peak || M. W. Buie || V || align=right data-sort-value="0.71" | 710 m || 
|-id=447 bgcolor=#d6d6d6
| 279447 ||  || — || September 7, 2004 || Socorro || LINEAR || EOS || align=right | 2.6 km || 
|-id=448 bgcolor=#fefefe
| 279448 ||  || — || August 19, 2006 || Palomar || NEAT || — || align=right | 1.2 km || 
|-id=449 bgcolor=#fefefe
| 279449 ||  || — || September 7, 2010 || La Sagra || OAM Obs. || NYS || align=right data-sort-value="0.97" | 970 m || 
|-id=450 bgcolor=#fefefe
| 279450 ||  || — || September 24, 2000 || Socorro || LINEAR || — || align=right data-sort-value="0.86" | 860 m || 
|-id=451 bgcolor=#fefefe
| 279451 ||  || — || September 11, 2010 || La Sagra || OAM Obs. || NYS || align=right | 1.2 km || 
|-id=452 bgcolor=#E9E9E9
| 279452 ||  || — || September 6, 2010 || La Sagra || OAM Obs. || — || align=right | 2.5 km || 
|-id=453 bgcolor=#d6d6d6
| 279453 ||  || — || September 23, 2005 || Kitt Peak || Spacewatch || — || align=right | 2.9 km || 
|-id=454 bgcolor=#d6d6d6
| 279454 ||  || — || September 13, 2004 || Kitt Peak || Spacewatch || — || align=right | 3.7 km || 
|-id=455 bgcolor=#E9E9E9
| 279455 ||  || — || October 2, 2006 || Kitt Peak || Spacewatch || — || align=right | 1.2 km || 
|-id=456 bgcolor=#d6d6d6
| 279456 ||  || — || August 13, 2004 || Cerro Tololo || M. W. Buie || HYG || align=right | 2.7 km || 
|-id=457 bgcolor=#E9E9E9
| 279457 ||  || — || October 21, 2001 || Kitt Peak || Spacewatch || — || align=right | 2.8 km || 
|-id=458 bgcolor=#d6d6d6
| 279458 ||  || — || August 7, 2004 || Palomar || NEAT || VER || align=right | 3.4 km || 
|-id=459 bgcolor=#E9E9E9
| 279459 ||  || — || November 22, 1997 || Kitt Peak || Spacewatch || MRX || align=right | 1.4 km || 
|-id=460 bgcolor=#d6d6d6
| 279460 ||  || — || February 16, 2007 || Mount Lemmon || Mount Lemmon Survey || — || align=right | 3.6 km || 
|-id=461 bgcolor=#d6d6d6
| 279461 ||  || — || February 12, 2002 || Kitt Peak || Spacewatch || EOS || align=right | 2.3 km || 
|-id=462 bgcolor=#fefefe
| 279462 ||  || — || October 23, 2003 || Kitt Peak || Spacewatch || NYS || align=right data-sort-value="0.78" | 780 m || 
|-id=463 bgcolor=#E9E9E9
| 279463 ||  || — || July 8, 2005 || Kitt Peak || Spacewatch || GEF || align=right | 1.7 km || 
|-id=464 bgcolor=#E9E9E9
| 279464 ||  || — || October 10, 2001 || Palomar || NEAT || — || align=right | 2.9 km || 
|-id=465 bgcolor=#fefefe
| 279465 ||  || — || November 24, 2003 || Kitt Peak || Spacewatch || V || align=right data-sort-value="0.75" | 750 m || 
|-id=466 bgcolor=#E9E9E9
| 279466 ||  || — || April 26, 2006 || Mount Lemmon || Mount Lemmon Survey || PAL || align=right | 2.0 km || 
|-id=467 bgcolor=#fefefe
| 279467 ||  || — || February 10, 1996 || Kitt Peak || Spacewatch || — || align=right data-sort-value="0.83" | 830 m || 
|-id=468 bgcolor=#d6d6d6
| 279468 ||  || — || November 21, 1993 || Kitt Peak || Spacewatch || — || align=right | 4.1 km || 
|-id=469 bgcolor=#d6d6d6
| 279469 ||  || — || August 10, 2004 || Socorro || LINEAR || EOS || align=right | 2.9 km || 
|-id=470 bgcolor=#E9E9E9
| 279470 ||  || — || October 7, 2010 || Catalina || CSS || — || align=right | 2.4 km || 
|-id=471 bgcolor=#d6d6d6
| 279471 ||  || — || February 13, 2001 || Kitt Peak || Spacewatch || — || align=right | 3.2 km || 
|-id=472 bgcolor=#E9E9E9
| 279472 ||  || — || November 19, 2006 || Kitt Peak || Spacewatch || AER || align=right | 1.8 km || 
|-id=473 bgcolor=#fefefe
| 279473 ||  || — || December 19, 2003 || Kitt Peak || Spacewatch || — || align=right | 1.0 km || 
|-id=474 bgcolor=#fefefe
| 279474 ||  || — || July 3, 1995 || Kitt Peak || Spacewatch || V || align=right data-sort-value="0.81" | 810 m || 
|-id=475 bgcolor=#fefefe
| 279475 ||  || — || September 17, 2006 || Catalina || CSS || V || align=right data-sort-value="0.76" | 760 m || 
|-id=476 bgcolor=#fefefe
| 279476 ||  || — || December 18, 2003 || Socorro || LINEAR || — || align=right | 1.3 km || 
|-id=477 bgcolor=#E9E9E9
| 279477 ||  || — || June 20, 2005 || Palomar || NEAT || — || align=right | 1.6 km || 
|-id=478 bgcolor=#fefefe
| 279478 ||  || — || October 10, 1999 || Socorro || LINEAR || V || align=right data-sort-value="0.79" | 790 m || 
|-id=479 bgcolor=#d6d6d6
| 279479 ||  || — || January 8, 2006 || Mount Lemmon || Mount Lemmon Survey || — || align=right | 3.7 km || 
|-id=480 bgcolor=#E9E9E9
| 279480 ||  || — || October 27, 2006 || Mount Lemmon || Mount Lemmon Survey || — || align=right | 1.2 km || 
|-id=481 bgcolor=#d6d6d6
| 279481 ||  || — || January 8, 2000 || Kitt Peak || Spacewatch || — || align=right | 4.3 km || 
|-id=482 bgcolor=#E9E9E9
| 279482 ||  || — || September 29, 2005 || Kitt Peak || Spacewatch || — || align=right | 2.1 km || 
|-id=483 bgcolor=#E9E9E9
| 279483 ||  || — || December 15, 2006 || Kitt Peak || Spacewatch || — || align=right | 1.7 km || 
|-id=484 bgcolor=#d6d6d6
| 279484 ||  || — || September 8, 2004 || Socorro || LINEAR || EOS || align=right | 2.5 km || 
|-id=485 bgcolor=#d6d6d6
| 279485 ||  || — || August 20, 2003 || Palomar || NEAT || — || align=right | 4.1 km || 
|-id=486 bgcolor=#fefefe
| 279486 ||  || — || December 15, 2003 || Kitt Peak || Spacewatch || FLO || align=right data-sort-value="0.68" | 680 m || 
|-id=487 bgcolor=#C2FFFF
| 279487 ||  || — || October 1, 2009 || Mount Lemmon || Mount Lemmon Survey || L4 || align=right | 14 km || 
|-id=488 bgcolor=#fefefe
| 279488 ||  || — || September 19, 2003 || Kitt Peak || Spacewatch || — || align=right data-sort-value="0.80" | 800 m || 
|-id=489 bgcolor=#E9E9E9
| 279489 ||  || — || October 14, 2001 || Apache Point || SDSS || — || align=right | 1.7 km || 
|-id=490 bgcolor=#fefefe
| 279490 ||  || — || December 6, 2002 || Socorro || LINEAR || — || align=right | 1.6 km || 
|-id=491 bgcolor=#E9E9E9
| 279491 ||  || — || February 8, 2002 || Anderson Mesa || LONEOS || — || align=right | 3.4 km || 
|-id=492 bgcolor=#E9E9E9
| 279492 ||  || — || November 16, 2006 || Mount Lemmon || Mount Lemmon Survey || EUN || align=right | 1.8 km || 
|-id=493 bgcolor=#fefefe
| 279493 ||  || — || April 14, 2004 || Kitt Peak || Spacewatch || NYS || align=right data-sort-value="0.83" | 830 m || 
|-id=494 bgcolor=#d6d6d6
| 279494 ||  || — || August 12, 2001 || Haleakala || NEAT || MEL || align=right | 4.8 km || 
|-id=495 bgcolor=#E9E9E9
| 279495 ||  || — || March 27, 2003 || Kitt Peak || Spacewatch || — || align=right | 1.5 km || 
|-id=496 bgcolor=#d6d6d6
| 279496 ||  || — || September 17, 2003 || Kitt Peak || Spacewatch || — || align=right | 3.8 km || 
|-id=497 bgcolor=#d6d6d6
| 279497 ||  || — || October 24, 2005 || Mauna Kea || A. Boattini || — || align=right | 3.5 km || 
|-id=498 bgcolor=#fefefe
| 279498 ||  || — || September 22, 2003 || Palomar || NEAT || — || align=right data-sort-value="0.82" | 820 m || 
|-id=499 bgcolor=#d6d6d6
| 279499 ||  || — || September 20, 2003 || Kitt Peak || Spacewatch || VER || align=right | 2.6 km || 
|-id=500 bgcolor=#d6d6d6
| 279500 ||  || — || October 14, 2009 || Mount Lemmon || Mount Lemmon Survey || SYL7:4 || align=right | 5.9 km || 
|}

279501–279600 

|-bgcolor=#fefefe
| 279501 ||  || — || September 16, 2006 || Catalina || CSS || — || align=right data-sort-value="0.94" | 940 m || 
|-id=502 bgcolor=#fefefe
| 279502 ||  || — || December 9, 2006 || Kitt Peak || Spacewatch || MAS || align=right data-sort-value="0.80" | 800 m || 
|-id=503 bgcolor=#d6d6d6
| 279503 ||  || — || February 27, 2000 || Kitt Peak || Spacewatch || — || align=right | 4.0 km || 
|-id=504 bgcolor=#d6d6d6
| 279504 ||  || — || January 7, 2000 || Socorro || LINEAR || SAN || align=right | 2.7 km || 
|-id=505 bgcolor=#d6d6d6
| 279505 ||  || — || October 24, 1998 || Kitt Peak || Spacewatch || — || align=right | 3.7 km || 
|-id=506 bgcolor=#d6d6d6
| 279506 ||  || — || September 24, 1973 || Palomar || PLS || — || align=right | 2.8 km || 
|-id=507 bgcolor=#fefefe
| 279507 ||  || — || July 4, 2005 || Socorro || LINEAR || — || align=right | 1.3 km || 
|-id=508 bgcolor=#E9E9E9
| 279508 ||  || — || February 7, 2002 || Kitt Peak || Spacewatch || AGN || align=right | 1.2 km || 
|-id=509 bgcolor=#d6d6d6
| 279509 ||  || — || October 5, 2004 || Kitt Peak || Spacewatch || KAR || align=right | 1.2 km || 
|-id=510 bgcolor=#d6d6d6
| 279510 ||  || — || January 9, 2006 || Mount Lemmon || Mount Lemmon Survey || — || align=right | 4.4 km || 
|-id=511 bgcolor=#C2FFFF
| 279511 ||  || — || April 25, 2003 || Kitt Peak || Spacewatch || L4 || align=right | 11 km || 
|-id=512 bgcolor=#d6d6d6
| 279512 ||  || — || May 9, 2007 || Kitt Peak || Spacewatch || URS || align=right | 4.2 km || 
|-id=513 bgcolor=#d6d6d6
| 279513 ||  || — || January 9, 2006 || Kitt Peak || Spacewatch || — || align=right | 4.1 km || 
|-id=514 bgcolor=#E9E9E9
| 279514 ||  || — || May 31, 2003 || Cerro Tololo || M. W. Buie || — || align=right | 2.6 km || 
|-id=515 bgcolor=#d6d6d6
| 279515 ||  || — || September 21, 2003 || Kitt Peak || Spacewatch || — || align=right | 3.6 km || 
|-id=516 bgcolor=#E9E9E9
| 279516 ||  || — || March 14, 2007 || Kitt Peak || Spacewatch || — || align=right | 2.8 km || 
|-id=517 bgcolor=#d6d6d6
| 279517 ||  || — || September 30, 2003 || Kitt Peak || Spacewatch || EOS || align=right | 2.8 km || 
|-id=518 bgcolor=#E9E9E9
| 279518 ||  || — || October 22, 2009 || Catalina || CSS || — || align=right | 2.0 km || 
|-id=519 bgcolor=#E9E9E9
| 279519 ||  || — || October 30, 2005 || Mount Lemmon || Mount Lemmon Survey || — || align=right | 1.9 km || 
|-id=520 bgcolor=#fefefe
| 279520 ||  || — || October 1, 2003 || Kitt Peak || Spacewatch || — || align=right data-sort-value="0.89" | 890 m || 
|-id=521 bgcolor=#fefefe
| 279521 ||  || — || December 14, 2006 || Palomar || NEAT || — || align=right | 1.2 km || 
|-id=522 bgcolor=#E9E9E9
| 279522 ||  || — || January 6, 1998 || Kitt Peak || Spacewatch || — || align=right | 1.3 km || 
|-id=523 bgcolor=#d6d6d6
| 279523 ||  || — || December 18, 2004 || Mount Lemmon || Mount Lemmon Survey || — || align=right | 3.0 km || 
|-id=524 bgcolor=#fefefe
| 279524 ||  || — || March 3, 2000 || Socorro || LINEAR || — || align=right | 1.00 km || 
|-id=525 bgcolor=#d6d6d6
| 279525 ||  || — || October 24, 2005 || Mauna Kea || A. Boattini || — || align=right | 3.0 km || 
|-id=526 bgcolor=#fefefe
| 279526 ||  || — || July 29, 2005 || Palomar || NEAT || FLO || align=right | 1.1 km || 
|-id=527 bgcolor=#fefefe
| 279527 ||  || — || August 30, 2005 || Kitt Peak || Spacewatch || — || align=right | 1.0 km || 
|-id=528 bgcolor=#d6d6d6
| 279528 ||  || — || May 18, 2002 || Kitt Peak || Spacewatch || EOS || align=right | 2.5 km || 
|-id=529 bgcolor=#d6d6d6
| 279529 ||  || — || December 12, 2004 || Kitt Peak || Spacewatch || — || align=right | 3.7 km || 
|-id=530 bgcolor=#E9E9E9
| 279530 ||  || — || October 13, 2005 || Kitt Peak || Spacewatch || — || align=right | 1.5 km || 
|-id=531 bgcolor=#d6d6d6
| 279531 ||  || — || December 12, 2004 || Kitt Peak || Spacewatch || THM || align=right | 3.1 km || 
|-id=532 bgcolor=#E9E9E9
| 279532 ||  || — || September 14, 2004 || Anderson Mesa || LONEOS || PAD || align=right | 2.7 km || 
|-id=533 bgcolor=#E9E9E9
| 279533 ||  || — || March 12, 2007 || Kitt Peak || Spacewatch || AEO || align=right | 1.6 km || 
|-id=534 bgcolor=#E9E9E9
| 279534 ||  || — || September 7, 2004 || Kitt Peak || Spacewatch || — || align=right | 1.9 km || 
|-id=535 bgcolor=#fefefe
| 279535 ||  || — || October 27, 1998 || Kitt Peak || Spacewatch || — || align=right data-sort-value="0.90" | 900 m || 
|-id=536 bgcolor=#fefefe
| 279536 ||  || — || April 12, 2004 || Kitt Peak || Spacewatch || V || align=right | 1.1 km || 
|-id=537 bgcolor=#fefefe
| 279537 ||  || — || December 1, 2003 || Kitt Peak || Spacewatch || — || align=right data-sort-value="0.90" | 900 m || 
|-id=538 bgcolor=#fefefe
| 279538 ||  || — || March 12, 2004 || Palomar || NEAT || — || align=right | 1.4 km || 
|-id=539 bgcolor=#d6d6d6
| 279539 ||  || — || April 22, 2007 || Mount Lemmon || Mount Lemmon Survey || — || align=right | 4.0 km || 
|-id=540 bgcolor=#d6d6d6
| 279540 ||  || — || February 2, 2006 || Kitt Peak || Spacewatch || — || align=right | 3.7 km || 
|-id=541 bgcolor=#fefefe
| 279541 ||  || — || March 29, 2000 || Kitt Peak || Spacewatch || NYS || align=right data-sort-value="0.86" | 860 m || 
|-id=542 bgcolor=#d6d6d6
| 279542 ||  || — || July 30, 2008 || Mount Lemmon || Mount Lemmon Survey || LIX || align=right | 5.3 km || 
|-id=543 bgcolor=#E9E9E9
| 279543 ||  || — || September 11, 2004 || Kitt Peak || Spacewatch || PAD || align=right | 1.7 km || 
|-id=544 bgcolor=#d6d6d6
| 279544 ||  || — || June 19, 1998 || Caussols || ODAS || — || align=right | 3.7 km || 
|-id=545 bgcolor=#fefefe
| 279545 ||  || — || March 13, 2004 || Palomar || NEAT || — || align=right | 1.3 km || 
|-id=546 bgcolor=#E9E9E9
| 279546 ||  || — || December 24, 2005 || Kitt Peak || Spacewatch || HOF || align=right | 3.4 km || 
|-id=547 bgcolor=#d6d6d6
| 279547 ||  || — || February 27, 2006 || Kitt Peak || Spacewatch || HYG || align=right | 2.7 km || 
|-id=548 bgcolor=#fefefe
| 279548 ||  || — || February 7, 2000 || Kitt Peak || Spacewatch || — || align=right data-sort-value="0.99" | 990 m || 
|-id=549 bgcolor=#d6d6d6
| 279549 ||  || — || September 28, 2003 || Anderson Mesa || LONEOS || EOS || align=right | 2.8 km || 
|-id=550 bgcolor=#d6d6d6
| 279550 ||  || — || January 6, 2006 || Mount Lemmon || Mount Lemmon Survey || — || align=right | 2.7 km || 
|-id=551 bgcolor=#fefefe
| 279551 ||  || — || March 15, 2004 || Socorro || LINEAR || — || align=right data-sort-value="0.87" | 870 m || 
|-id=552 bgcolor=#fefefe
| 279552 ||  || — || September 30, 2003 || Kitt Peak || Spacewatch || — || align=right data-sort-value="0.82" | 820 m || 
|-id=553 bgcolor=#d6d6d6
| 279553 ||  || — || December 1, 2005 || Kitt Peak || Spacewatch || — || align=right | 5.0 km || 
|-id=554 bgcolor=#d6d6d6
| 279554 ||  || — || January 27, 2006 || Mount Lemmon || Mount Lemmon Survey || — || align=right | 2.0 km || 
|-id=555 bgcolor=#E9E9E9
| 279555 ||  || — || November 26, 2005 || Kitt Peak || Spacewatch || — || align=right | 1.9 km || 
|-id=556 bgcolor=#E9E9E9
| 279556 ||  || — || April 19, 2007 || Mount Lemmon || Mount Lemmon Survey || — || align=right | 3.8 km || 
|-id=557 bgcolor=#fefefe
| 279557 ||  || — || April 11, 2004 || Palomar || NEAT || V || align=right data-sort-value="0.95" | 950 m || 
|-id=558 bgcolor=#E9E9E9
| 279558 ||  || — || December 29, 1997 || Kitt Peak || Spacewatch || — || align=right | 2.7 km || 
|-id=559 bgcolor=#fefefe
| 279559 ||  || — || March 16, 2004 || Kitt Peak || Spacewatch || — || align=right data-sort-value="0.95" | 950 m || 
|-id=560 bgcolor=#fefefe
| 279560 ||  || — || December 21, 2006 || Kitt Peak || Spacewatch || — || align=right data-sort-value="0.99" | 990 m || 
|-id=561 bgcolor=#d6d6d6
| 279561 ||  || — || November 18, 2003 || Kitt Peak || Spacewatch || EOS || align=right | 2.6 km || 
|-id=562 bgcolor=#E9E9E9
| 279562 ||  || — || November 27, 2000 || Kitt Peak || Spacewatch || HEN || align=right | 1.3 km || 
|-id=563 bgcolor=#E9E9E9
| 279563 ||  || — || October 7, 2004 || Kitt Peak || Spacewatch || AGN || align=right | 1.6 km || 
|-id=564 bgcolor=#E9E9E9
| 279564 ||  || — || February 7, 2002 || Kitt Peak || Spacewatch || WIT || align=right | 1.2 km || 
|-id=565 bgcolor=#d6d6d6
| 279565 ||  || — || February 9, 2003 || Haleakala || NEAT || 3:2 || align=right | 7.4 km || 
|-id=566 bgcolor=#fefefe
| 279566 ||  || — || August 27, 2001 || Kitt Peak || Spacewatch || — || align=right data-sort-value="0.90" | 900 m || 
|-id=567 bgcolor=#d6d6d6
| 279567 ||  || — || August 11, 2002 || Palomar || NEAT || ALA || align=right | 4.2 km || 
|-id=568 bgcolor=#d6d6d6
| 279568 ||  || — || September 6, 2008 || Kitt Peak || Spacewatch || THM || align=right | 2.7 km || 
|-id=569 bgcolor=#E9E9E9
| 279569 ||  || — || December 27, 2005 || Kitt Peak || Spacewatch || MRX || align=right | 1.2 km || 
|-id=570 bgcolor=#E9E9E9
| 279570 ||  || — || April 12, 2002 || Kitt Peak || Spacewatch || PAD || align=right | 2.0 km || 
|-id=571 bgcolor=#fefefe
| 279571 ||  || — || January 18, 2004 || Kitt Peak || Spacewatch || FLO || align=right data-sort-value="0.93" | 930 m || 
|-id=572 bgcolor=#d6d6d6
| 279572 ||  || — || September 24, 2008 || Mount Lemmon || Mount Lemmon Survey || HYG || align=right | 3.3 km || 
|-id=573 bgcolor=#E9E9E9
| 279573 ||  || — || March 28, 2003 || Anderson Mesa || LONEOS || — || align=right | 1.5 km || 
|-id=574 bgcolor=#E9E9E9
| 279574 ||  || — || December 29, 2005 || Mount Lemmon || Mount Lemmon Survey || WIT || align=right | 1.0 km || 
|-id=575 bgcolor=#fefefe
| 279575 ||  || — || June 13, 2005 || Mount Lemmon || Mount Lemmon Survey || — || align=right data-sort-value="0.69" | 690 m || 
|-id=576 bgcolor=#d6d6d6
| 279576 ||  || — || September 22, 2003 || Kitt Peak || Spacewatch || — || align=right | 2.6 km || 
|-id=577 bgcolor=#FA8072
| 279577 ||  || — || October 24, 1981 || Palomar || S. J. Bus || — || align=right | 1.6 km || 
|-id=578 bgcolor=#fefefe
| 279578 ||  || — || March 16, 2004 || Campo Imperatore || CINEOS || — || align=right data-sort-value="0.87" | 870 m || 
|-id=579 bgcolor=#E9E9E9
| 279579 ||  || — || September 12, 2004 || Kitt Peak || Spacewatch || — || align=right | 1.3 km || 
|-id=580 bgcolor=#E9E9E9
| 279580 ||  || — || October 17, 1995 || Kitt Peak || Spacewatch || — || align=right | 2.5 km || 
|-id=581 bgcolor=#E9E9E9
| 279581 ||  || — || May 11, 2007 || Mount Lemmon || Mount Lemmon Survey || HOF || align=right | 2.9 km || 
|-id=582 bgcolor=#fefefe
| 279582 ||  || — || February 2, 2000 || Kitt Peak || Spacewatch || NYS || align=right data-sort-value="0.78" | 780 m || 
|-id=583 bgcolor=#E9E9E9
| 279583 ||  || — || December 2, 2005 || Kitt Peak || Spacewatch || — || align=right | 1.7 km || 
|-id=584 bgcolor=#E9E9E9
| 279584 ||  || — || March 14, 2007 || Kitt Peak || Spacewatch || — || align=right | 1.8 km || 
|-id=585 bgcolor=#d6d6d6
| 279585 ||  || — || March 1, 2005 || Catalina || CSS || LUT || align=right | 4.9 km || 
|-id=586 bgcolor=#E9E9E9
| 279586 ||  || — || February 1, 1997 || Kitt Peak || Spacewatch || PAD || align=right | 2.3 km || 
|-id=587 bgcolor=#d6d6d6
| 279587 ||  || — || December 20, 2009 || Mount Lemmon || Mount Lemmon Survey || — || align=right | 3.5 km || 
|-id=588 bgcolor=#d6d6d6
| 279588 ||  || — || February 9, 2005 || Kitt Peak || Spacewatch || — || align=right | 2.8 km || 
|-id=589 bgcolor=#fefefe
| 279589 ||  || — || March 14, 2004 || Kitt Peak || Spacewatch || NYS || align=right data-sort-value="0.88" | 880 m || 
|-id=590 bgcolor=#E9E9E9
| 279590 ||  || — || July 30, 2000 || Cerro Tololo || M. W. Buie || — || align=right data-sort-value="0.88" | 880 m || 
|-id=591 bgcolor=#fefefe
| 279591 ||  || — || May 19, 2005 || Mount Lemmon || Mount Lemmon Survey || FLO || align=right data-sort-value="0.64" | 640 m || 
|-id=592 bgcolor=#fefefe
| 279592 ||  || — || April 14, 2001 || Kitt Peak || Spacewatch || FLO || align=right data-sort-value="0.66" | 660 m || 
|-id=593 bgcolor=#E9E9E9
| 279593 ||  || — || March 24, 2003 || Kitt Peak || Spacewatch || — || align=right data-sort-value="0.97" | 970 m || 
|-id=594 bgcolor=#fefefe
| 279594 ||  || — || May 1, 2000 || Anderson Mesa || LONEOS || V || align=right data-sort-value="0.92" | 920 m || 
|-id=595 bgcolor=#E9E9E9
| 279595 ||  || — || November 6, 1996 || Kitt Peak || Spacewatch || — || align=right data-sort-value="0.99" | 990 m || 
|-id=596 bgcolor=#d6d6d6
| 279596 ||  || — || September 14, 2002 || Palomar || NEAT || — || align=right | 3.3 km || 
|-id=597 bgcolor=#d6d6d6
| 279597 ||  || — || September 14, 2007 || Catalina || CSS || — || align=right | 5.4 km || 
|-id=598 bgcolor=#fefefe
| 279598 ||  || — || April 28, 2000 || Kitt Peak || Spacewatch || MAS || align=right data-sort-value="0.65" | 650 m || 
|-id=599 bgcolor=#E9E9E9
| 279599 ||  || — || January 20, 2002 || Anderson Mesa || LONEOS || JUN || align=right | 1.2 km || 
|-id=600 bgcolor=#d6d6d6
| 279600 ||  || — || December 15, 2004 || Kitt Peak || Spacewatch || — || align=right | 3.1 km || 
|}

279601–279700 

|-bgcolor=#E9E9E9
| 279601 ||  || — || January 7, 2006 || Kitt Peak || Spacewatch || — || align=right | 2.6 km || 
|-id=602 bgcolor=#d6d6d6
| 279602 ||  || — || February 4, 2005 || Palomar || NEAT || EUP || align=right | 4.4 km || 
|-id=603 bgcolor=#fefefe
| 279603 ||  || — || March 11, 2004 || Palomar || NEAT || FLO || align=right data-sort-value="0.98" | 980 m || 
|-id=604 bgcolor=#E9E9E9
| 279604 ||  || — || January 5, 2006 || Mount Lemmon || Mount Lemmon Survey || RAF || align=right | 1.2 km || 
|-id=605 bgcolor=#E9E9E9
| 279605 ||  || — || November 12, 2005 || Kitt Peak || Spacewatch || — || align=right | 1.6 km || 
|-id=606 bgcolor=#d6d6d6
| 279606 ||  || — || July 22, 2001 || Ondřejov || P. Pravec, L. Kotková || — || align=right | 3.4 km || 
|-id=607 bgcolor=#d6d6d6
| 279607 ||  || — || March 3, 2000 || Socorro || LINEAR || — || align=right | 3.8 km || 
|-id=608 bgcolor=#d6d6d6
| 279608 ||  || — || April 5, 2000 || Anderson Mesa || LONEOS || — || align=right | 3.6 km || 
|-id=609 bgcolor=#E9E9E9
| 279609 ||  || — || January 19, 2002 || Anderson Mesa || LONEOS || — || align=right | 2.3 km || 
|-id=610 bgcolor=#E9E9E9
| 279610 ||  || — || January 23, 2006 || Catalina || CSS || — || align=right | 3.0 km || 
|-id=611 bgcolor=#fefefe
| 279611 ||  || — || April 26, 2000 || Piszkéstető || K. Sárneczky || — || align=right | 1.0 km || 
|-id=612 bgcolor=#fefefe
| 279612 ||  || — || December 11, 2006 || Kitt Peak || Spacewatch || NYS || align=right data-sort-value="0.91" | 910 m || 
|-id=613 bgcolor=#fefefe
| 279613 ||  || — || March 19, 2004 || Socorro || LINEAR || — || align=right data-sort-value="0.87" | 870 m || 
|-id=614 bgcolor=#fefefe
| 279614 ||  || — || April 21, 1998 || Socorro || LINEAR || — || align=right data-sort-value="0.90" | 900 m || 
|-id=615 bgcolor=#d6d6d6
| 279615 ||  || — || February 9, 2005 || Kitt Peak || Spacewatch || HYG || align=right | 3.8 km || 
|-id=616 bgcolor=#fefefe
| 279616 ||  || — || October 13, 2006 || Kitt Peak || Spacewatch || — || align=right data-sort-value="0.62" | 620 m || 
|-id=617 bgcolor=#d6d6d6
| 279617 ||  || — || August 6, 2007 || Lulin Observatory || LUSS || — || align=right | 3.4 km || 
|-id=618 bgcolor=#d6d6d6
| 279618 ||  || — || October 19, 2003 || Kitt Peak || Spacewatch || TEL || align=right | 1.3 km || 
|-id=619 bgcolor=#fefefe
| 279619 ||  || — || January 27, 2007 || Kitt Peak || Spacewatch || MAS || align=right data-sort-value="0.80" | 800 m || 
|-id=620 bgcolor=#d6d6d6
| 279620 ||  || — || March 3, 2005 || Kitt Peak || Spacewatch || — || align=right | 3.3 km || 
|-id=621 bgcolor=#fefefe
| 279621 ||  || — || January 23, 2007 || Socorro || LINEAR || — || align=right | 1.3 km || 
|-id=622 bgcolor=#E9E9E9
| 279622 ||  || — || January 9, 2002 || Socorro || LINEAR || — || align=right | 1.7 km || 
|-id=623 bgcolor=#d6d6d6
| 279623 ||  || — || December 31, 1994 || Kitt Peak || Spacewatch || — || align=right | 4.1 km || 
|-id=624 bgcolor=#fefefe
| 279624 ||  || — || November 11, 2006 || Mount Lemmon || Mount Lemmon Survey || — || align=right data-sort-value="0.81" | 810 m || 
|-id=625 bgcolor=#d6d6d6
| 279625 ||  || — || November 16, 1999 || Kitt Peak || Spacewatch || KOR || align=right | 1.6 km || 
|-id=626 bgcolor=#d6d6d6
| 279626 ||  || — || February 14, 2005 || Kitt Peak || Spacewatch || — || align=right | 3.6 km || 
|-id=627 bgcolor=#fefefe
| 279627 ||  || — || April 13, 1996 || Kitt Peak || Spacewatch || NYS || align=right data-sort-value="0.88" | 880 m || 
|-id=628 bgcolor=#d6d6d6
| 279628 ||  || — || October 21, 2003 || Socorro || LINEAR || — || align=right | 4.5 km || 
|-id=629 bgcolor=#E9E9E9
| 279629 ||  || — || May 6, 2002 || Palomar || NEAT || — || align=right | 3.3 km || 
|-id=630 bgcolor=#d6d6d6
| 279630 ||  || — || December 15, 2004 || Kitt Peak || Spacewatch || — || align=right | 3.6 km || 
|-id=631 bgcolor=#fefefe
| 279631 ||  || — || May 3, 2000 || Kitt Peak || Spacewatch || — || align=right | 1.6 km || 
|-id=632 bgcolor=#fefefe
| 279632 ||  || — || February 8, 2007 || Mount Lemmon || Mount Lemmon Survey || ERI || align=right | 1.8 km || 
|-id=633 bgcolor=#E9E9E9
| 279633 ||  || — || March 27, 2003 || Kitt Peak || Spacewatch || — || align=right | 1.1 km || 
|-id=634 bgcolor=#E9E9E9
| 279634 ||  || — || March 23, 2003 || Kitt Peak || Spacewatch || — || align=right data-sort-value="0.95" | 950 m || 
|-id=635 bgcolor=#fefefe
| 279635 ||  || — || March 26, 2004 || Kitt Peak || Spacewatch || V || align=right data-sort-value="0.74" | 740 m || 
|-id=636 bgcolor=#E9E9E9
| 279636 ||  || — || April 22, 2002 || Kitt Peak || Spacewatch || — || align=right | 3.4 km || 
|-id=637 bgcolor=#fefefe
| 279637 ||  || — || August 30, 2005 || Kitt Peak || Spacewatch || — || align=right | 1.1 km || 
|-id=638 bgcolor=#E9E9E9
| 279638 ||  || — || August 4, 2003 || Socorro || LINEAR || — || align=right | 1.9 km || 
|-id=639 bgcolor=#fefefe
| 279639 ||  || — || May 30, 2000 || Kitt Peak || Spacewatch || V || align=right data-sort-value="0.66" | 660 m || 
|-id=640 bgcolor=#fefefe
| 279640 ||  || — || October 15, 1998 || Caussols || ODAS || V || align=right data-sort-value="0.82" | 820 m || 
|-id=641 bgcolor=#d6d6d6
| 279641 ||  || — || December 18, 2004 || Mount Lemmon || Mount Lemmon Survey || — || align=right | 3.1 km || 
|-id=642 bgcolor=#fefefe
| 279642 ||  || — || September 7, 2008 || Mount Lemmon || Mount Lemmon Survey || — || align=right data-sort-value="0.87" | 870 m || 
|-id=643 bgcolor=#E9E9E9
| 279643 ||  || — || November 6, 2005 || Mount Lemmon || Mount Lemmon Survey || — || align=right | 1.2 km || 
|-id=644 bgcolor=#E9E9E9
| 279644 ||  || — || September 17, 2003 || Kitt Peak || Spacewatch || — || align=right | 2.7 km || 
|-id=645 bgcolor=#d6d6d6
| 279645 ||  || — || March 27, 2000 || Anderson Mesa || LONEOS || — || align=right | 3.5 km || 
|-id=646 bgcolor=#E9E9E9
| 279646 ||  || — || September 21, 2008 || Mount Lemmon || Mount Lemmon Survey || MRX || align=right | 1.6 km || 
|-id=647 bgcolor=#d6d6d6
| 279647 ||  || — || September 28, 2003 || Kitt Peak || Spacewatch || — || align=right | 4.0 km || 
|-id=648 bgcolor=#E9E9E9
| 279648 ||  || — || April 19, 1998 || Socorro || LINEAR || — || align=right | 2.3 km || 
|-id=649 bgcolor=#d6d6d6
| 279649 ||  || — || August 29, 2002 || Kitt Peak || Spacewatch || — || align=right | 3.5 km || 
|-id=650 bgcolor=#E9E9E9
| 279650 ||  || — || March 11, 2007 || Mount Lemmon || Mount Lemmon Survey || — || align=right | 2.5 km || 
|-id=651 bgcolor=#d6d6d6
| 279651 ||  || — || February 2, 2006 || Kitt Peak || Spacewatch || — || align=right | 3.0 km || 
|-id=652 bgcolor=#fefefe
| 279652 ||  || — || August 28, 2005 || Kitt Peak || Spacewatch || — || align=right data-sort-value="0.93" | 930 m || 
|-id=653 bgcolor=#fefefe
| 279653 ||  || — || March 24, 2004 || Bergisch Gladbac || W. Bickel || ERI || align=right | 1.6 km || 
|-id=654 bgcolor=#fefefe
| 279654 ||  || — || May 11, 2000 || Anderson Mesa || LONEOS || ERI || align=right | 2.1 km || 
|-id=655 bgcolor=#E9E9E9
| 279655 ||  || — || January 31, 2006 || Kitt Peak || Spacewatch || — || align=right | 2.2 km || 
|-id=656 bgcolor=#d6d6d6
| 279656 ||  || — || March 1, 2005 || Catalina || CSS || EUP || align=right | 4.9 km || 
|-id=657 bgcolor=#d6d6d6
| 279657 ||  || — || February 1, 2000 || Kitt Peak || Spacewatch || — || align=right | 3.3 km || 
|-id=658 bgcolor=#fefefe
| 279658 ||  || — || December 1, 2006 || Mount Lemmon || Mount Lemmon Survey || V || align=right data-sort-value="0.73" | 730 m || 
|-id=659 bgcolor=#fefefe
| 279659 ||  || — || November 16, 2006 || Kitt Peak || Spacewatch || — || align=right | 1.00 km || 
|-id=660 bgcolor=#E9E9E9
| 279660 ||  || — || August 4, 2003 || Kitt Peak || Spacewatch || MRX || align=right | 1.3 km || 
|-id=661 bgcolor=#fefefe
| 279661 ||  || — || November 1, 2005 || Mount Lemmon || Mount Lemmon Survey || NYS || align=right data-sort-value="0.70" | 700 m || 
|-id=662 bgcolor=#E9E9E9
| 279662 ||  || — || May 10, 2003 || Kitt Peak || Spacewatch || — || align=right | 1.3 km || 
|-id=663 bgcolor=#E9E9E9
| 279663 ||  || — || October 15, 2004 || Mount Lemmon || Mount Lemmon Survey || MRX || align=right | 1.2 km || 
|-id=664 bgcolor=#d6d6d6
| 279664 ||  || — || December 15, 2004 || Kitt Peak || Spacewatch || — || align=right | 2.7 km || 
|-id=665 bgcolor=#d6d6d6
| 279665 ||  || — || February 27, 2000 || Kitt Peak || Spacewatch || — || align=right | 3.4 km || 
|-id=666 bgcolor=#d6d6d6
| 279666 ||  || — || April 17, 2001 || Anderson Mesa || LONEOS || — || align=right | 3.4 km || 
|-id=667 bgcolor=#E9E9E9
| 279667 ||  || — || September 17, 2004 || Kitt Peak || Spacewatch || — || align=right data-sort-value="0.88" | 880 m || 
|-id=668 bgcolor=#fefefe
| 279668 ||  || — || December 3, 2005 || Kitt Peak || Spacewatch || — || align=right | 1.0 km || 
|-id=669 bgcolor=#E9E9E9
| 279669 ||  || — || March 11, 2002 || Palomar || NEAT || — || align=right | 1.4 km || 
|-id=670 bgcolor=#fefefe
| 279670 ||  || — || February 25, 2007 || Mount Lemmon || Mount Lemmon Survey || V || align=right data-sort-value="0.72" | 720 m || 
|-id=671 bgcolor=#fefefe
| 279671 ||  || — || April 5, 2000 || Socorro || LINEAR || MAS || align=right data-sort-value="0.82" | 820 m || 
|-id=672 bgcolor=#d6d6d6
| 279672 ||  || — || December 11, 2004 || Kitt Peak || Spacewatch || — || align=right | 5.5 km || 
|-id=673 bgcolor=#E9E9E9
| 279673 ||  || — || February 25, 2007 || Mount Lemmon || Mount Lemmon Survey || GER || align=right | 1.8 km || 
|-id=674 bgcolor=#d6d6d6
| 279674 ||  || — || December 17, 2003 || Kitt Peak || Spacewatch || — || align=right | 3.9 km || 
|-id=675 bgcolor=#d6d6d6
| 279675 ||  || — || August 10, 2007 || Kitt Peak || Spacewatch || — || align=right | 3.1 km || 
|-id=676 bgcolor=#d6d6d6
| 279676 ||  || — || October 10, 2002 || Palomar || NEAT || — || align=right | 3.1 km || 
|-id=677 bgcolor=#E9E9E9
| 279677 ||  || — || October 1, 1999 || Kitt Peak || Spacewatch || — || align=right | 3.2 km || 
|-id=678 bgcolor=#E9E9E9
| 279678 ||  || — || January 7, 2006 || Mount Lemmon || Mount Lemmon Survey || AGN || align=right | 1.6 km || 
|-id=679 bgcolor=#d6d6d6
| 279679 ||  || — || September 22, 2008 || Kitt Peak || Spacewatch || — || align=right | 2.9 km || 
|-id=680 bgcolor=#E9E9E9
| 279680 ||  || — || December 17, 2001 || Socorro || LINEAR || — || align=right | 1.0 km || 
|-id=681 bgcolor=#fefefe
| 279681 ||  || — || February 29, 2004 || Kitt Peak || Spacewatch || — || align=right data-sort-value="0.77" | 770 m || 
|-id=682 bgcolor=#fefefe
| 279682 ||  || — || September 22, 2009 || Mount Lemmon || Mount Lemmon Survey || V || align=right data-sort-value="0.72" | 720 m || 
|-id=683 bgcolor=#fefefe
| 279683 ||  || — || October 31, 2005 || Kitt Peak || Spacewatch || — || align=right data-sort-value="0.98" | 980 m || 
|-id=684 bgcolor=#E9E9E9
| 279684 ||  || — || May 10, 2007 || Mount Lemmon || Mount Lemmon Survey || — || align=right | 2.4 km || 
|-id=685 bgcolor=#d6d6d6
| 279685 ||  || — || October 30, 2002 || Apache Point || SDSS || — || align=right | 3.1 km || 
|-id=686 bgcolor=#fefefe
| 279686 ||  || — || February 16, 2004 || Kitt Peak || Spacewatch || NYS || align=right data-sort-value="0.73" | 730 m || 
|-id=687 bgcolor=#fefefe
| 279687 ||  || — || April 15, 2004 || Anderson Mesa || LONEOS || — || align=right | 1.1 km || 
|-id=688 bgcolor=#fefefe
| 279688 ||  || — || December 21, 2003 || Kitt Peak || Spacewatch || FLO || align=right data-sort-value="0.89" | 890 m || 
|-id=689 bgcolor=#E9E9E9
| 279689 ||  || — || January 9, 2006 || Mount Lemmon || Mount Lemmon Survey || AGN || align=right | 1.5 km || 
|-id=690 bgcolor=#fefefe
| 279690 ||  || — || March 11, 2007 || Catalina || CSS || V || align=right data-sort-value="0.89" | 890 m || 
|-id=691 bgcolor=#fefefe
| 279691 ||  || — || November 30, 1999 || Kitt Peak || Spacewatch || — || align=right data-sort-value="0.87" | 870 m || 
|-id=692 bgcolor=#d6d6d6
| 279692 ||  || — || July 19, 2001 || Palomar || NEAT || LIX || align=right | 4.6 km || 
|-id=693 bgcolor=#d6d6d6
| 279693 ||  || — || March 4, 2005 || Kitt Peak || Spacewatch || HYG || align=right | 4.0 km || 
|-id=694 bgcolor=#d6d6d6
| 279694 ||  || — || February 2, 2005 || Kitt Peak || Spacewatch || — || align=right | 2.7 km || 
|-id=695 bgcolor=#d6d6d6
| 279695 ||  || — || March 17, 2005 || Mount Lemmon || Mount Lemmon Survey || — || align=right | 4.4 km || 
|-id=696 bgcolor=#fefefe
| 279696 ||  || — || November 16, 2006 || Mount Lemmon || Mount Lemmon Survey || — || align=right data-sort-value="0.79" | 790 m || 
|-id=697 bgcolor=#E9E9E9
| 279697 ||  || — || February 3, 2002 || Palomar || NEAT || — || align=right | 1.5 km || 
|-id=698 bgcolor=#E9E9E9
| 279698 ||  || — || September 20, 1995 || Kitt Peak || Spacewatch || — || align=right | 1.4 km || 
|-id=699 bgcolor=#E9E9E9
| 279699 ||  || — || May 26, 2003 || Kitt Peak || Spacewatch || ADE || align=right | 2.4 km || 
|-id=700 bgcolor=#E9E9E9
| 279700 ||  || — || September 7, 2008 || Mount Lemmon || Mount Lemmon Survey || — || align=right | 2.0 km || 
|}

279701–279800 

|-bgcolor=#fefefe
| 279701 ||  || — || September 17, 1998 || Kitt Peak || Spacewatch || FLO || align=right data-sort-value="0.57" | 570 m || 
|-id=702 bgcolor=#E9E9E9
| 279702 ||  || — || August 22, 2003 || Palomar || NEAT || HOF || align=right | 3.1 km || 
|-id=703 bgcolor=#E9E9E9
| 279703 ||  || — || March 6, 2002 || Palomar || NEAT || — || align=right | 3.4 km || 
|-id=704 bgcolor=#d6d6d6
| 279704 ||  || — || April 27, 2000 || Kitt Peak || Spacewatch || — || align=right | 3.7 km || 
|-id=705 bgcolor=#E9E9E9
| 279705 ||  || — || April 11, 2002 || Socorro || LINEAR || — || align=right | 2.7 km || 
|-id=706 bgcolor=#d6d6d6
| 279706 ||  || — || October 24, 2003 || Kitt Peak || Spacewatch || EOS || align=right | 2.8 km || 
|-id=707 bgcolor=#d6d6d6
| 279707 ||  || — || May 9, 2006 || Mount Lemmon || Mount Lemmon Survey || — || align=right | 4.0 km || 
|-id=708 bgcolor=#E9E9E9
| 279708 ||  || — || December 27, 2005 || Kitt Peak || Spacewatch || — || align=right | 1.3 km || 
|-id=709 bgcolor=#E9E9E9
| 279709 ||  || — || September 28, 2000 || Kitt Peak || Spacewatch || — || align=right | 1.2 km || 
|-id=710 bgcolor=#E9E9E9
| 279710 ||  || — || February 2, 2006 || Kitt Peak || Spacewatch || AGN || align=right | 1.2 km || 
|-id=711 bgcolor=#fefefe
| 279711 ||  || — || April 22, 2004 || Socorro || LINEAR || NYS || align=right data-sort-value="0.71" | 710 m || 
|-id=712 bgcolor=#FA8072
| 279712 ||  || — || December 11, 2004 || Catalina || CSS || — || align=right | 2.2 km || 
|-id=713 bgcolor=#E9E9E9
| 279713 ||  || — || January 6, 2006 || Kitt Peak || Spacewatch || — || align=right | 1.0 km || 
|-id=714 bgcolor=#E9E9E9
| 279714 ||  || — || January 31, 2006 || Mount Lemmon || Mount Lemmon Survey || — || align=right | 1.5 km || 
|-id=715 bgcolor=#E9E9E9
| 279715 ||  || — || February 2, 2006 || Mount Lemmon || Mount Lemmon Survey || AGN || align=right | 1.7 km || 
|-id=716 bgcolor=#d6d6d6
| 279716 ||  || — || April 11, 2005 || Mount Lemmon || Mount Lemmon Survey || 7:4 || align=right | 6.2 km || 
|-id=717 bgcolor=#d6d6d6
| 279717 ||  || — || March 9, 2005 || Mayhill || A. Lowe || — || align=right | 5.6 km || 
|-id=718 bgcolor=#FA8072
| 279718 ||  || — || September 24, 1973 || Palomar || PLS || — || align=right data-sort-value="0.78" | 780 m || 
|-id=719 bgcolor=#d6d6d6
| 279719 ||  || — || September 30, 1973 || Palomar || PLS || — || align=right | 3.7 km || 
|-id=720 bgcolor=#E9E9E9
| 279720 ||  || — || September 30, 1973 || Palomar || PLS || — || align=right | 3.0 km || 
|-id=721 bgcolor=#d6d6d6
| 279721 ||  || — || October 17, 1977 || Palomar || PLS || — || align=right | 3.3 km || 
|-id=722 bgcolor=#E9E9E9
| 279722 ||  || — || October 16, 1977 || Palomar || PLS || — || align=right | 2.9 km || 
|-id=723 bgcolor=#E9E9E9
| 279723 Wittenberg ||  ||  || September 12, 1991 || Tautenburg Observatory || F. Börngen, L. D. Schmadel || — || align=right | 1.2 km || 
|-id=724 bgcolor=#E9E9E9
| 279724 ||  || — || September 8, 1991 || Kitt Peak || Spacewatch || — || align=right | 1.2 km || 
|-id=725 bgcolor=#fefefe
| 279725 ||  || — || February 26, 1993 || Kitt Peak || Spacewatch || — || align=right data-sort-value="0.96" | 960 m || 
|-id=726 bgcolor=#d6d6d6
| 279726 ||  || — || October 9, 1993 || La Silla || E. W. Elst || — || align=right | 3.8 km || 
|-id=727 bgcolor=#E9E9E9
| 279727 ||  || — || April 16, 1994 || Kitt Peak || Spacewatch || — || align=right | 1.2 km || 
|-id=728 bgcolor=#fefefe
| 279728 ||  || — || September 27, 1994 || Kitt Peak || Spacewatch || FLO || align=right data-sort-value="0.90" | 900 m || 
|-id=729 bgcolor=#fefefe
| 279729 ||  || — || April 24, 1995 || Kitt Peak || Spacewatch || — || align=right | 1.1 km || 
|-id=730 bgcolor=#fefefe
| 279730 ||  || — || June 24, 1995 || Kitt Peak || Spacewatch || — || align=right | 1.1 km || 
|-id=731 bgcolor=#E9E9E9
| 279731 ||  || — || July 27, 1995 || Kitt Peak || Spacewatch || AER || align=right | 1.6 km || 
|-id=732 bgcolor=#E9E9E9
| 279732 ||  || — || October 17, 1995 || Kitt Peak || Spacewatch || — || align=right | 1.6 km || 
|-id=733 bgcolor=#fefefe
| 279733 ||  || — || October 23, 1995 || Kitt Peak || Spacewatch || NYS || align=right data-sort-value="0.68" | 680 m || 
|-id=734 bgcolor=#E9E9E9
| 279734 ||  || — || November 15, 1995 || Kitt Peak || Spacewatch || HEN || align=right | 1.1 km || 
|-id=735 bgcolor=#E9E9E9
| 279735 ||  || — || November 16, 1995 || Kitt Peak || Spacewatch || AEO || align=right | 1.2 km || 
|-id=736 bgcolor=#E9E9E9
| 279736 ||  || — || November 16, 1995 || Kitt Peak || Spacewatch || — || align=right | 2.8 km || 
|-id=737 bgcolor=#d6d6d6
| 279737 ||  || — || October 18, 1996 || Kitt Peak || Spacewatch || EOS || align=right | 2.2 km || 
|-id=738 bgcolor=#E9E9E9
| 279738 ||  || — || January 3, 1997 || Kitt Peak || Spacewatch || — || align=right | 2.2 km || 
|-id=739 bgcolor=#d6d6d6
| 279739 ||  || — || March 3, 1997 || Kitt Peak || Spacewatch || LIX || align=right | 4.8 km || 
|-id=740 bgcolor=#E9E9E9
| 279740 ||  || — || January 23, 1998 || Kitt Peak || Spacewatch || — || align=right data-sort-value="0.88" | 880 m || 
|-id=741 bgcolor=#E9E9E9
| 279741 ||  || — || March 24, 1998 || Caussols || ODAS || — || align=right | 1.9 km || 
|-id=742 bgcolor=#fefefe
| 279742 ||  || — || April 20, 1998 || Socorro || LINEAR || — || align=right data-sort-value="0.94" | 940 m || 
|-id=743 bgcolor=#E9E9E9
| 279743 ||  || — || April 28, 1998 || Kitt Peak || Spacewatch || — || align=right | 1.5 km || 
|-id=744 bgcolor=#FFC2E0
| 279744 ||  || — || May 24, 1998 || Socorro || LINEAR || APOPHAcritical || align=right data-sort-value="0.41" | 410 m || 
|-id=745 bgcolor=#E9E9E9
| 279745 ||  || — || May 22, 1998 || Socorro || LINEAR || EUN || align=right | 1.9 km || 
|-id=746 bgcolor=#d6d6d6
| 279746 ||  || — || June 20, 1998 || Kitt Peak || Spacewatch || — || align=right | 2.9 km || 
|-id=747 bgcolor=#E9E9E9
| 279747 ||  || — || August 30, 1998 || Kitt Peak || Spacewatch || AGN || align=right | 1.3 km || 
|-id=748 bgcolor=#E9E9E9
| 279748 ||  || — || August 26, 1998 || La Silla || E. W. Elst || — || align=right | 3.8 km || 
|-id=749 bgcolor=#E9E9E9
| 279749 ||  || — || September 14, 1998 || Socorro || LINEAR || DOR || align=right | 3.4 km || 
|-id=750 bgcolor=#fefefe
| 279750 ||  || — || September 16, 1998 || Kitt Peak || Spacewatch || V || align=right data-sort-value="0.66" | 660 m || 
|-id=751 bgcolor=#fefefe
| 279751 ||  || — || September 20, 1998 || Kitt Peak || Spacewatch || FLO || align=right data-sort-value="0.75" | 750 m || 
|-id=752 bgcolor=#E9E9E9
| 279752 ||  || — || September 19, 1998 || Socorro || LINEAR || — || align=right | 2.9 km || 
|-id=753 bgcolor=#E9E9E9
| 279753 ||  || — || September 26, 1998 || Socorro || LINEAR || — || align=right | 4.2 km || 
|-id=754 bgcolor=#fefefe
| 279754 ||  || — || October 19, 1998 || Xinglong || SCAP || — || align=right | 1.3 km || 
|-id=755 bgcolor=#fefefe
| 279755 ||  || — || November 18, 1998 || Kitt Peak || Spacewatch || V || align=right data-sort-value="0.87" | 870 m || 
|-id=756 bgcolor=#E9E9E9
| 279756 ||  || — || November 19, 1998 || Caussols || ODAS || MRX || align=right | 1.3 km || 
|-id=757 bgcolor=#d6d6d6
| 279757 ||  || — || December 10, 1998 || Kitt Peak || Spacewatch || KOR || align=right | 1.9 km || 
|-id=758 bgcolor=#fefefe
| 279758 ||  || — || February 9, 1999 || Kitt Peak || Spacewatch || — || align=right data-sort-value="0.90" | 900 m || 
|-id=759 bgcolor=#d6d6d6
| 279759 ||  || — || February 9, 1999 || Kitt Peak || Spacewatch || — || align=right | 3.8 km || 
|-id=760 bgcolor=#d6d6d6
| 279760 ||  || — || March 9, 1999 || Kitt Peak || Spacewatch || — || align=right | 3.2 km || 
|-id=761 bgcolor=#d6d6d6
| 279761 ||  || — || March 20, 1999 || Apache Point || SDSS || — || align=right | 3.0 km || 
|-id=762 bgcolor=#E9E9E9
| 279762 ||  || — || March 20, 1999 || Apache Point || SDSS || — || align=right | 1.1 km || 
|-id=763 bgcolor=#fefefe
| 279763 ||  || — || April 6, 1999 || Kitt Peak || Spacewatch || NYS || align=right data-sort-value="0.94" | 940 m || 
|-id=764 bgcolor=#E9E9E9
| 279764 ||  || — || July 13, 1999 || Socorro || LINEAR || — || align=right | 1.9 km || 
|-id=765 bgcolor=#E9E9E9
| 279765 ||  || — || September 5, 1999 || Kitt Peak || Spacewatch || — || align=right | 1.1 km || 
|-id=766 bgcolor=#E9E9E9
| 279766 ||  || — || September 6, 1999 || Višnjan Observatory || K. Korlević || — || align=right | 1.4 km || 
|-id=767 bgcolor=#E9E9E9
| 279767 ||  || — || September 7, 1999 || Socorro || LINEAR || — || align=right | 2.0 km || 
|-id=768 bgcolor=#FA8072
| 279768 ||  || — || September 8, 1999 || Socorro || LINEAR || — || align=right data-sort-value="0.50" | 500 m || 
|-id=769 bgcolor=#d6d6d6
| 279769 ||  || — || September 13, 1999 || Kitt Peak || Spacewatch || — || align=right | 3.5 km || 
|-id=770 bgcolor=#E9E9E9
| 279770 ||  || — || September 9, 1999 || Socorro || LINEAR || — || align=right | 1.4 km || 
|-id=771 bgcolor=#fefefe
| 279771 ||  || — || September 9, 1999 || Socorro || LINEAR || — || align=right data-sort-value="0.91" | 910 m || 
|-id=772 bgcolor=#E9E9E9
| 279772 ||  || — || October 4, 1999 || Kitt Peak || Spacewatch || — || align=right | 1.8 km || 
|-id=773 bgcolor=#E9E9E9
| 279773 ||  || — || October 7, 1999 || Kitt Peak || Spacewatch || — || align=right | 1.5 km || 
|-id=774 bgcolor=#E9E9E9
| 279774 ||  || — || October 7, 1999 || Kitt Peak || Spacewatch || MAR || align=right | 1.3 km || 
|-id=775 bgcolor=#E9E9E9
| 279775 ||  || — || October 11, 1999 || Kitt Peak || Spacewatch || — || align=right | 2.0 km || 
|-id=776 bgcolor=#FA8072
| 279776 ||  || — || October 4, 1999 || Socorro || LINEAR || — || align=right data-sort-value="0.88" | 880 m || 
|-id=777 bgcolor=#E9E9E9
| 279777 ||  || — || October 7, 1999 || Socorro || LINEAR || — || align=right | 2.0 km || 
|-id=778 bgcolor=#E9E9E9
| 279778 ||  || — || October 12, 1999 || Socorro || LINEAR || GAL || align=right | 2.6 km || 
|-id=779 bgcolor=#E9E9E9
| 279779 ||  || — || October 13, 1999 || Socorro || LINEAR || — || align=right | 2.0 km || 
|-id=780 bgcolor=#E9E9E9
| 279780 ||  || — || October 14, 1999 || Socorro || LINEAR || — || align=right | 2.2 km || 
|-id=781 bgcolor=#E9E9E9
| 279781 ||  || — || October 1, 1999 || Catalina || CSS || ADE || align=right | 3.5 km || 
|-id=782 bgcolor=#E9E9E9
| 279782 ||  || — || October 2, 1999 || Kitt Peak || Spacewatch || — || align=right | 1.7 km || 
|-id=783 bgcolor=#E9E9E9
| 279783 ||  || — || October 3, 1999 || Socorro || LINEAR || — || align=right | 2.4 km || 
|-id=784 bgcolor=#E9E9E9
| 279784 ||  || — || October 9, 1999 || Socorro || LINEAR || — || align=right | 1.7 km || 
|-id=785 bgcolor=#E9E9E9
| 279785 ||  || — || October 28, 1999 || Catalina || CSS || — || align=right | 2.4 km || 
|-id=786 bgcolor=#E9E9E9
| 279786 ||  || — || November 2, 1999 || Kitt Peak || Spacewatch || — || align=right | 2.1 km || 
|-id=787 bgcolor=#E9E9E9
| 279787 ||  || — || November 4, 1999 || Kitt Peak || Spacewatch || WIT || align=right | 1.0 km || 
|-id=788 bgcolor=#E9E9E9
| 279788 ||  || — || November 4, 1999 || Socorro || LINEAR || — || align=right | 2.0 km || 
|-id=789 bgcolor=#fefefe
| 279789 ||  || — || November 1, 1999 || Kitt Peak || Spacewatch || — || align=right data-sort-value="0.71" | 710 m || 
|-id=790 bgcolor=#E9E9E9
| 279790 ||  || — || November 4, 1999 || Socorro || LINEAR || JUN || align=right | 1.9 km || 
|-id=791 bgcolor=#E9E9E9
| 279791 ||  || — || November 9, 1999 || Socorro || LINEAR || — || align=right | 2.8 km || 
|-id=792 bgcolor=#E9E9E9
| 279792 ||  || — || November 9, 1999 || Socorro || LINEAR || — || align=right | 2.8 km || 
|-id=793 bgcolor=#fefefe
| 279793 ||  || — || November 9, 1999 || Socorro || LINEAR || — || align=right data-sort-value="0.80" | 800 m || 
|-id=794 bgcolor=#E9E9E9
| 279794 ||  || — || December 3, 1999 || Socorro || LINEAR || — || align=right | 2.7 km || 
|-id=795 bgcolor=#E9E9E9
| 279795 ||  || — || December 7, 1999 || Socorro || LINEAR || — || align=right | 3.3 km || 
|-id=796 bgcolor=#E9E9E9
| 279796 ||  || — || December 7, 1999 || Socorro || LINEAR || MAR || align=right | 1.7 km || 
|-id=797 bgcolor=#E9E9E9
| 279797 ||  || — || December 31, 1999 || Kitt Peak || Spacewatch || — || align=right | 2.5 km || 
|-id=798 bgcolor=#fefefe
| 279798 ||  || — || January 7, 2000 || Socorro || LINEAR || H || align=right data-sort-value="0.82" | 820 m || 
|-id=799 bgcolor=#fefefe
| 279799 ||  || — || January 29, 2000 || Socorro || LINEAR || H || align=right data-sort-value="0.87" | 870 m || 
|-id=800 bgcolor=#fefefe
| 279800 ||  || — || February 5, 2000 || Kitt Peak || M. W. Buie || V || align=right data-sort-value="0.66" | 660 m || 
|}

279801–279900 

|-bgcolor=#fefefe
| 279801 ||  || — || February 3, 2000 || Kitt Peak || Spacewatch || FLO || align=right data-sort-value="0.80" | 800 m || 
|-id=802 bgcolor=#fefefe
| 279802 ||  || — || February 29, 2000 || Socorro || LINEAR || — || align=right | 1.2 km || 
|-id=803 bgcolor=#d6d6d6
| 279803 ||  || — || March 8, 2000 || Kitt Peak || Spacewatch || URS || align=right | 3.9 km || 
|-id=804 bgcolor=#fefefe
| 279804 ||  || — || March 10, 2000 || Socorro || LINEAR || NYS || align=right data-sort-value="0.77" | 770 m || 
|-id=805 bgcolor=#fefefe
| 279805 ||  || — || March 5, 2000 || Socorro || LINEAR || — || align=right | 1.1 km || 
|-id=806 bgcolor=#d6d6d6
| 279806 ||  || — || March 5, 2000 || Socorro || LINEAR || — || align=right | 2.4 km || 
|-id=807 bgcolor=#d6d6d6
| 279807 ||  || — || March 25, 2000 || Kitt Peak || Spacewatch || — || align=right | 3.4 km || 
|-id=808 bgcolor=#fefefe
| 279808 ||  || — || March 25, 2000 || Kitt Peak || Spacewatch || FLO || align=right data-sort-value="0.78" | 780 m || 
|-id=809 bgcolor=#E9E9E9
| 279809 ||  || — || April 5, 2000 || Socorro || LINEAR || — || align=right | 2.9 km || 
|-id=810 bgcolor=#fefefe
| 279810 ||  || — || April 5, 2000 || Socorro || LINEAR || V || align=right | 1.0 km || 
|-id=811 bgcolor=#fefefe
| 279811 ||  || — || April 5, 2000 || Socorro || LINEAR || NYS || align=right data-sort-value="0.71" | 710 m || 
|-id=812 bgcolor=#fefefe
| 279812 ||  || — || April 5, 2000 || Socorro || LINEAR || — || align=right data-sort-value="0.90" | 900 m || 
|-id=813 bgcolor=#fefefe
| 279813 ||  || — || April 24, 2000 || Kitt Peak || Spacewatch || MAS || align=right data-sort-value="0.70" | 700 m || 
|-id=814 bgcolor=#d6d6d6
| 279814 ||  || — || April 29, 2000 || Socorro || LINEAR || Tj (2.99) || align=right | 3.3 km || 
|-id=815 bgcolor=#FA8072
| 279815 ||  || — || May 4, 2000 || Socorro || LINEAR || — || align=right | 1.7 km || 
|-id=816 bgcolor=#FFC2E0
| 279816 ||  || — || May 1, 2000 || Socorro || LINEAR || APOPHA || align=right data-sort-value="0.56" | 560 m || 
|-id=817 bgcolor=#d6d6d6
| 279817 ||  || — || May 3, 2000 || Ondřejov || P. Kušnirák || — || align=right | 4.0 km || 
|-id=818 bgcolor=#fefefe
| 279818 ||  || — || May 7, 2000 || Socorro || LINEAR || — || align=right | 1.2 km || 
|-id=819 bgcolor=#d6d6d6
| 279819 ||  || — || May 31, 2000 || Anderson Mesa || LONEOS || — || align=right | 3.9 km || 
|-id=820 bgcolor=#fefefe
| 279820 ||  || — || June 4, 2000 || Haleakala || NEAT || — || align=right data-sort-value="0.90" | 900 m || 
|-id=821 bgcolor=#E9E9E9
| 279821 ||  || — || August 28, 2000 || Socorro || LINEAR || — || align=right | 1.7 km || 
|-id=822 bgcolor=#fefefe
| 279822 ||  || — || August 24, 2000 || Socorro || LINEAR || NYScritical || align=right data-sort-value="0.79" | 790 m || 
|-id=823 bgcolor=#FA8072
| 279823 ||  || — || September 1, 2000 || Socorro || LINEAR || PHO || align=right | 1.8 km || 
|-id=824 bgcolor=#fefefe
| 279824 ||  || — || September 1, 2000 || Socorro || LINEAR || — || align=right | 1.8 km || 
|-id=825 bgcolor=#fefefe
| 279825 ||  || — || September 3, 2000 || Socorro || LINEAR || — || align=right | 1.0 km || 
|-id=826 bgcolor=#fefefe
| 279826 ||  || — || September 23, 2000 || Socorro || LINEAR || NYS || align=right data-sort-value="0.69" | 690 m || 
|-id=827 bgcolor=#E9E9E9
| 279827 ||  || — || September 23, 2000 || Socorro || LINEAR || — || align=right | 3.6 km || 
|-id=828 bgcolor=#E9E9E9
| 279828 ||  || — || September 24, 2000 || Socorro || LINEAR || — || align=right | 2.2 km || 
|-id=829 bgcolor=#E9E9E9
| 279829 ||  || — || September 23, 2000 || Socorro || LINEAR || — || align=right | 1.5 km || 
|-id=830 bgcolor=#fefefe
| 279830 ||  || — || September 23, 2000 || Socorro || LINEAR || — || align=right | 1.2 km || 
|-id=831 bgcolor=#fefefe
| 279831 ||  || — || September 24, 2000 || Socorro || LINEAR || — || align=right data-sort-value="0.92" | 920 m || 
|-id=832 bgcolor=#fefefe
| 279832 ||  || — || September 28, 2000 || Socorro || LINEAR || PHO || align=right | 1.8 km || 
|-id=833 bgcolor=#d6d6d6
| 279833 ||  || — || September 23, 2000 || Socorro || LINEAR || EOS || align=right | 2.9 km || 
|-id=834 bgcolor=#d6d6d6
| 279834 ||  || — || September 19, 2000 || Kvistaberg || UDAS || TIR || align=right | 6.6 km || 
|-id=835 bgcolor=#E9E9E9
| 279835 ||  || — || September 28, 2000 || Socorro || LINEAR || — || align=right | 1.9 km || 
|-id=836 bgcolor=#E9E9E9
| 279836 ||  || — || September 26, 2000 || Socorro || LINEAR || — || align=right | 1.3 km || 
|-id=837 bgcolor=#E9E9E9
| 279837 ||  || — || September 28, 2000 || Socorro || LINEAR || — || align=right | 1.4 km || 
|-id=838 bgcolor=#E9E9E9
| 279838 ||  || — || September 28, 2000 || Kitt Peak || Spacewatch || — || align=right | 1.7 km || 
|-id=839 bgcolor=#d6d6d6
| 279839 ||  || — || September 22, 2000 || Socorro || LINEAR || TIR || align=right | 4.7 km || 
|-id=840 bgcolor=#E9E9E9
| 279840 ||  || — || October 1, 2000 || Socorro || LINEAR || — || align=right | 2.3 km || 
|-id=841 bgcolor=#E9E9E9
| 279841 ||  || — || October 1, 2000 || Socorro || LINEAR || — || align=right | 1.5 km || 
|-id=842 bgcolor=#fefefe
| 279842 ||  || — || October 24, 2000 || Socorro || LINEAR || — || align=right | 1.3 km || 
|-id=843 bgcolor=#E9E9E9
| 279843 ||  || — || October 31, 2000 || Socorro || LINEAR || EUN || align=right | 1.5 km || 
|-id=844 bgcolor=#E9E9E9
| 279844 ||  || — || October 30, 2000 || Socorro || LINEAR || — || align=right | 1.4 km || 
|-id=845 bgcolor=#E9E9E9
| 279845 ||  || — || November 1, 2000 || Socorro || LINEAR || — || align=right | 1.4 km || 
|-id=846 bgcolor=#fefefe
| 279846 ||  || — || November 20, 2000 || Socorro || LINEAR || — || align=right | 1.3 km || 
|-id=847 bgcolor=#E9E9E9
| 279847 ||  || — || December 1, 2000 || Socorro || LINEAR || — || align=right | 1.7 km || 
|-id=848 bgcolor=#E9E9E9
| 279848 ||  || — || December 4, 2000 || Socorro || LINEAR || — || align=right | 1.9 km || 
|-id=849 bgcolor=#E9E9E9
| 279849 ||  || — || December 21, 2000 || Eskridge || G. Hug || — || align=right | 1.7 km || 
|-id=850 bgcolor=#E9E9E9
| 279850 ||  || — || December 30, 2000 || Socorro || LINEAR || EUN || align=right | 1.8 km || 
|-id=851 bgcolor=#E9E9E9
| 279851 ||  || — || December 30, 2000 || Socorro || LINEAR || INO || align=right | 1.9 km || 
|-id=852 bgcolor=#E9E9E9
| 279852 ||  || — || January 4, 2001 || Haleakala || NEAT || — || align=right | 2.1 km || 
|-id=853 bgcolor=#E9E9E9
| 279853 ||  || — || January 4, 2001 || Haleakala || NEAT || — || align=right | 2.2 km || 
|-id=854 bgcolor=#E9E9E9
| 279854 ||  || — || January 14, 2001 || Kitt Peak || Spacewatch || XIZ || align=right | 2.3 km || 
|-id=855 bgcolor=#E9E9E9
| 279855 ||  || — || January 21, 2001 || Socorro || LINEAR || — || align=right | 1.8 km || 
|-id=856 bgcolor=#d6d6d6
| 279856 ||  || — || February 1, 2001 || Socorro || LINEAR || — || align=right | 5.0 km || 
|-id=857 bgcolor=#E9E9E9
| 279857 ||  || — || February 17, 2001 || Socorro || LINEAR || DOR || align=right | 3.7 km || 
|-id=858 bgcolor=#E9E9E9
| 279858 ||  || — || February 19, 2001 || Nogales || Tenagra II Obs. || — || align=right | 2.1 km || 
|-id=859 bgcolor=#E9E9E9
| 279859 ||  || — || February 27, 2001 || Kitt Peak || Spacewatch || — || align=right | 3.4 km || 
|-id=860 bgcolor=#FA8072
| 279860 ||  || — || March 19, 2001 || Kitt Peak || Spacewatch || — || align=right data-sort-value="0.53" | 530 m || 
|-id=861 bgcolor=#E9E9E9
| 279861 ||  || — || March 20, 2001 || Kitt Peak || Spacewatch || HEN || align=right data-sort-value="0.97" | 970 m || 
|-id=862 bgcolor=#d6d6d6
| 279862 ||  || — || March 18, 2001 || Socorro || LINEAR || EOS || align=right | 2.4 km || 
|-id=863 bgcolor=#fefefe
| 279863 ||  || — || April 16, 2001 || Kitt Peak || Spacewatch || — || align=right data-sort-value="0.67" | 670 m || 
|-id=864 bgcolor=#d6d6d6
| 279864 ||  || — || April 24, 2001 || Kitt Peak || Spacewatch || 615 || align=right | 2.1 km || 
|-id=865 bgcolor=#fefefe
| 279865 ||  || — || April 27, 2001 || Kitt Peak || Spacewatch || — || align=right data-sort-value="0.88" | 880 m || 
|-id=866 bgcolor=#d6d6d6
| 279866 ||  || — || May 23, 2001 || Kitt Peak || Spacewatch || BRA || align=right | 2.2 km || 
|-id=867 bgcolor=#fefefe
| 279867 ||  || — || June 27, 2001 || Palomar || NEAT || — || align=right | 1.6 km || 
|-id=868 bgcolor=#d6d6d6
| 279868 ||  || — || June 28, 2001 || Anderson Mesa || LONEOS || — || align=right | 7.4 km || 
|-id=869 bgcolor=#d6d6d6
| 279869 ||  || — || July 13, 2001 || Palomar || NEAT || — || align=right | 4.0 km || 
|-id=870 bgcolor=#d6d6d6
| 279870 ||  || — || July 14, 2001 || Palomar || NEAT || — || align=right | 5.4 km || 
|-id=871 bgcolor=#fefefe
| 279871 ||  || — || July 17, 2001 || Haleakala || NEAT || NYS || align=right data-sort-value="0.73" | 730 m || 
|-id=872 bgcolor=#fefefe
| 279872 ||  || — || July 20, 2001 || Palomar || NEAT || — || align=right | 1.00 km || 
|-id=873 bgcolor=#fefefe
| 279873 ||  || — || July 27, 2001 || Prescott || P. G. Comba || H || align=right data-sort-value="0.68" | 680 m || 
|-id=874 bgcolor=#fefefe
| 279874 ||  || — || July 21, 2001 || Haleakala || NEAT || FLO || align=right data-sort-value="0.89" | 890 m || 
|-id=875 bgcolor=#fefefe
| 279875 ||  || — || July 27, 2001 || Haleakala || NEAT || — || align=right | 1.2 km || 
|-id=876 bgcolor=#E9E9E9
| 279876 ||  || — || August 11, 2001 || Palomar || NEAT || — || align=right | 2.0 km || 
|-id=877 bgcolor=#d6d6d6
| 279877 ||  || — || August 11, 2001 || Haleakala || NEAT || Tj (2.99) || align=right | 5.8 km || 
|-id=878 bgcolor=#fefefe
| 279878 ||  || — || August 11, 2001 || Haleakala || NEAT || H || align=right | 1.0 km || 
|-id=879 bgcolor=#d6d6d6
| 279879 ||  || — || August 10, 2001 || Palomar || NEAT || — || align=right | 6.5 km || 
|-id=880 bgcolor=#fefefe
| 279880 ||  || — || August 12, 2001 || Palomar || NEAT || H || align=right data-sort-value="0.79" | 790 m || 
|-id=881 bgcolor=#d6d6d6
| 279881 ||  || — || August 3, 2001 || Haleakala || NEAT || — || align=right | 7.1 km || 
|-id=882 bgcolor=#d6d6d6
| 279882 ||  || — || August 15, 2001 || Haleakala || NEAT || — || align=right | 3.3 km || 
|-id=883 bgcolor=#fefefe
| 279883 ||  || — || August 13, 2001 || Haleakala || NEAT || — || align=right | 1.1 km || 
|-id=884 bgcolor=#fefefe
| 279884 ||  || — || August 11, 2001 || Palomar || NEAT || V || align=right data-sort-value="0.82" | 820 m || 
|-id=885 bgcolor=#fefefe
| 279885 ||  || — || August 16, 2001 || Socorro || LINEAR || H || align=right data-sort-value="0.93" | 930 m || 
|-id=886 bgcolor=#d6d6d6
| 279886 ||  || — || August 16, 2001 || Socorro || LINEAR || — || align=right | 3.8 km || 
|-id=887 bgcolor=#fefefe
| 279887 ||  || — || August 16, 2001 || Socorro || LINEAR || — || align=right | 1.1 km || 
|-id=888 bgcolor=#fefefe
| 279888 ||  || — || August 22, 2001 || Socorro || LINEAR || H || align=right data-sort-value="0.89" | 890 m || 
|-id=889 bgcolor=#fefefe
| 279889 ||  || — || August 22, 2001 || Socorro || LINEAR || ERI || align=right | 2.2 km || 
|-id=890 bgcolor=#d6d6d6
| 279890 ||  || — || August 23, 2001 || Socorro || LINEAR || — || align=right | 5.1 km || 
|-id=891 bgcolor=#d6d6d6
| 279891 ||  || — || August 17, 2001 || Socorro || LINEAR || — || align=right | 4.5 km || 
|-id=892 bgcolor=#d6d6d6
| 279892 ||  || — || August 22, 2001 || Socorro || LINEAR || — || align=right | 4.0 km || 
|-id=893 bgcolor=#FA8072
| 279893 ||  || — || August 22, 2001 || Socorro || LINEAR || — || align=right | 1.4 km || 
|-id=894 bgcolor=#d6d6d6
| 279894 ||  || — || August 25, 2001 || Kitt Peak || Spacewatch || — || align=right | 3.7 km || 
|-id=895 bgcolor=#fefefe
| 279895 ||  || — || August 26, 2001 || Socorro || LINEAR || H || align=right | 1.6 km || 
|-id=896 bgcolor=#d6d6d6
| 279896 ||  || — || August 23, 2001 || Anderson Mesa || LONEOS || — || align=right | 3.7 km || 
|-id=897 bgcolor=#fefefe
| 279897 ||  || — || August 24, 2001 || Haleakala || NEAT || — || align=right | 1.2 km || 
|-id=898 bgcolor=#d6d6d6
| 279898 ||  || — || August 27, 2001 || Socorro || LINEAR || EOS || align=right | 3.0 km || 
|-id=899 bgcolor=#d6d6d6
| 279899 ||  || — || August 21, 2001 || Palomar || NEAT || — || align=right | 5.7 km || 
|-id=900 bgcolor=#d6d6d6
| 279900 ||  || — || August 23, 2001 || Socorro || LINEAR || — || align=right | 4.8 km || 
|}

279901–280000 

|-bgcolor=#d6d6d6
| 279901 ||  || — || August 24, 2001 || Anderson Mesa || LONEOS || — || align=right | 3.8 km || 
|-id=902 bgcolor=#d6d6d6
| 279902 ||  || — || August 24, 2001 || Anderson Mesa || LONEOS || — || align=right | 3.0 km || 
|-id=903 bgcolor=#fefefe
| 279903 ||  || — || August 24, 2001 || Palomar || NEAT || — || align=right data-sort-value="0.95" | 950 m || 
|-id=904 bgcolor=#d6d6d6
| 279904 ||  || — || August 24, 2001 || Anderson Mesa || LONEOS || EOS || align=right | 2.9 km || 
|-id=905 bgcolor=#fefefe
| 279905 ||  || — || August 24, 2001 || Anderson Mesa || LONEOS || FLO || align=right data-sort-value="0.73" | 730 m || 
|-id=906 bgcolor=#d6d6d6
| 279906 ||  || — || August 24, 2001 || Socorro || LINEAR || — || align=right | 4.0 km || 
|-id=907 bgcolor=#fefefe
| 279907 ||  || — || August 24, 2001 || Socorro || LINEAR || FLO || align=right data-sort-value="0.95" | 950 m || 
|-id=908 bgcolor=#E9E9E9
| 279908 ||  || — || August 24, 2001 || Haleakala || NEAT || — || align=right | 2.4 km || 
|-id=909 bgcolor=#d6d6d6
| 279909 ||  || — || August 19, 2001 || Socorro || LINEAR || TIR || align=right | 6.2 km || 
|-id=910 bgcolor=#d6d6d6
| 279910 ||  || — || August 17, 2001 || Palomar || NEAT || — || align=right | 4.5 km || 
|-id=911 bgcolor=#d6d6d6
| 279911 ||  || — || August 26, 2001 || Haleakala || NEAT || — || align=right | 4.8 km || 
|-id=912 bgcolor=#d6d6d6
| 279912 ||  || — || September 7, 2001 || Socorro || LINEAR || — || align=right | 3.8 km || 
|-id=913 bgcolor=#fefefe
| 279913 ||  || — || September 9, 2001 || Socorro || LINEAR || V || align=right | 1.00 km || 
|-id=914 bgcolor=#d6d6d6
| 279914 ||  || — || September 8, 2001 || Socorro || LINEAR || EUP || align=right | 8.7 km || 
|-id=915 bgcolor=#d6d6d6
| 279915 ||  || — || September 8, 2001 || Socorro || LINEAR || EUP || align=right | 7.4 km || 
|-id=916 bgcolor=#fefefe
| 279916 ||  || — || September 11, 2001 || Desert Eagle || W. K. Y. Yeung || — || align=right data-sort-value="0.82" | 820 m || 
|-id=917 bgcolor=#fefefe
| 279917 ||  || — || September 7, 2001 || Socorro || LINEAR || V || align=right data-sort-value="0.94" | 940 m || 
|-id=918 bgcolor=#E9E9E9
| 279918 ||  || — || September 7, 2001 || Socorro || LINEAR || — || align=right | 2.5 km || 
|-id=919 bgcolor=#fefefe
| 279919 ||  || — || September 12, 2001 || Socorro || LINEAR || PHO || align=right | 1.1 km || 
|-id=920 bgcolor=#fefefe
| 279920 ||  || — || September 10, 2001 || Socorro || LINEAR || — || align=right | 2.4 km || 
|-id=921 bgcolor=#d6d6d6
| 279921 ||  || — || September 11, 2001 || Anderson Mesa || LONEOS || — || align=right | 4.8 km || 
|-id=922 bgcolor=#fefefe
| 279922 ||  || — || September 11, 2001 || Anderson Mesa || LONEOS || — || align=right data-sort-value="0.90" | 900 m || 
|-id=923 bgcolor=#fefefe
| 279923 ||  || — || September 12, 2001 || Socorro || LINEAR || NYS || align=right data-sort-value="0.97" | 970 m || 
|-id=924 bgcolor=#d6d6d6
| 279924 ||  || — || September 12, 2001 || Socorro || LINEAR || THM || align=right | 3.1 km || 
|-id=925 bgcolor=#d6d6d6
| 279925 ||  || — || September 8, 2001 || Socorro || LINEAR || — || align=right | 3.6 km || 
|-id=926 bgcolor=#d6d6d6
| 279926 ||  || — || September 18, 2001 || Kitt Peak || Spacewatch || EOS || align=right | 2.9 km || 
|-id=927 bgcolor=#fefefe
| 279927 ||  || — || September 16, 2001 || Socorro || LINEAR || V || align=right | 1.1 km || 
|-id=928 bgcolor=#fefefe
| 279928 ||  || — || September 16, 2001 || Socorro || LINEAR || — || align=right data-sort-value="0.89" | 890 m || 
|-id=929 bgcolor=#fefefe
| 279929 ||  || — || September 16, 2001 || Socorro || LINEAR || V || align=right data-sort-value="0.82" | 820 m || 
|-id=930 bgcolor=#fefefe
| 279930 ||  || — || September 16, 2001 || Socorro || LINEAR || NYS || align=right data-sort-value="0.83" | 830 m || 
|-id=931 bgcolor=#d6d6d6
| 279931 ||  || — || September 16, 2001 || Socorro || LINEAR || EUP || align=right | 4.5 km || 
|-id=932 bgcolor=#fefefe
| 279932 ||  || — || September 16, 2001 || Socorro || LINEAR || ERI || align=right | 2.1 km || 
|-id=933 bgcolor=#d6d6d6
| 279933 ||  || — || September 16, 2001 || Socorro || LINEAR || — || align=right | 3.6 km || 
|-id=934 bgcolor=#d6d6d6
| 279934 ||  || — || September 16, 2001 || Socorro || LINEAR || THM || align=right | 3.0 km || 
|-id=935 bgcolor=#fefefe
| 279935 ||  || — || September 16, 2001 || Socorro || LINEAR || — || align=right data-sort-value="0.99" | 990 m || 
|-id=936 bgcolor=#fefefe
| 279936 ||  || — || September 17, 2001 || Socorro || LINEAR || — || align=right | 1.3 km || 
|-id=937 bgcolor=#d6d6d6
| 279937 ||  || — || September 19, 2001 || Anderson Mesa || LONEOS || LIX || align=right | 6.1 km || 
|-id=938 bgcolor=#d6d6d6
| 279938 ||  || — || September 19, 2001 || Socorro || LINEAR || HYG || align=right | 3.5 km || 
|-id=939 bgcolor=#d6d6d6
| 279939 ||  || — || September 20, 2001 || Socorro || LINEAR || — || align=right | 3.8 km || 
|-id=940 bgcolor=#fefefe
| 279940 ||  || — || September 20, 2001 || Socorro || LINEAR || V || align=right data-sort-value="0.89" | 890 m || 
|-id=941 bgcolor=#d6d6d6
| 279941 ||  || — || September 20, 2001 || Socorro || LINEAR || HYG || align=right | 3.5 km || 
|-id=942 bgcolor=#fefefe
| 279942 ||  || — || September 20, 2001 || Socorro || LINEAR || V || align=right data-sort-value="0.69" | 690 m || 
|-id=943 bgcolor=#fefefe
| 279943 ||  || — || September 16, 2001 || Socorro || LINEAR || FLO || align=right data-sort-value="0.77" | 770 m || 
|-id=944 bgcolor=#fefefe
| 279944 ||  || — || September 16, 2001 || Socorro || LINEAR || — || align=right | 1.4 km || 
|-id=945 bgcolor=#d6d6d6
| 279945 ||  || — || September 16, 2001 || Socorro || LINEAR || — || align=right | 4.6 km || 
|-id=946 bgcolor=#E9E9E9
| 279946 ||  || — || September 16, 2001 || Socorro || LINEAR || — || align=right | 1.5 km || 
|-id=947 bgcolor=#fefefe
| 279947 ||  || — || September 16, 2001 || Socorro || LINEAR || FLO || align=right data-sort-value="0.55" | 550 m || 
|-id=948 bgcolor=#fefefe
| 279948 ||  || — || September 17, 2001 || Socorro || LINEAR || V || align=right | 1.1 km || 
|-id=949 bgcolor=#d6d6d6
| 279949 ||  || — || September 17, 2001 || Socorro || LINEAR || — || align=right | 3.8 km || 
|-id=950 bgcolor=#fefefe
| 279950 ||  || — || September 16, 2001 || Socorro || LINEAR || FLO || align=right data-sort-value="0.92" | 920 m || 
|-id=951 bgcolor=#fefefe
| 279951 ||  || — || September 17, 2001 || Socorro || LINEAR || — || align=right | 1.2 km || 
|-id=952 bgcolor=#fefefe
| 279952 ||  || — || September 19, 2001 || Socorro || LINEAR || NYS || align=right data-sort-value="0.69" | 690 m || 
|-id=953 bgcolor=#d6d6d6
| 279953 ||  || — || September 19, 2001 || Socorro || LINEAR || THM || align=right | 2.7 km || 
|-id=954 bgcolor=#fefefe
| 279954 ||  || — || September 19, 2001 || Socorro || LINEAR || — || align=right data-sort-value="0.99" | 990 m || 
|-id=955 bgcolor=#fefefe
| 279955 ||  || — || September 19, 2001 || Socorro || LINEAR || — || align=right data-sort-value="0.90" | 900 m || 
|-id=956 bgcolor=#fefefe
| 279956 ||  || — || September 19, 2001 || Socorro || LINEAR || — || align=right data-sort-value="0.85" | 850 m || 
|-id=957 bgcolor=#fefefe
| 279957 ||  || — || September 19, 2001 || Socorro || LINEAR || MAS || align=right data-sort-value="0.78" | 780 m || 
|-id=958 bgcolor=#d6d6d6
| 279958 ||  || — || September 19, 2001 || Socorro || LINEAR || — || align=right | 3.9 km || 
|-id=959 bgcolor=#fefefe
| 279959 ||  || — || September 19, 2001 || Socorro || LINEAR || H || align=right data-sort-value="0.66" | 660 m || 
|-id=960 bgcolor=#d6d6d6
| 279960 ||  || — || September 25, 2001 || Bohyunsan || Y.-B. Jeon, B.-C. Lee || THM || align=right | 2.9 km || 
|-id=961 bgcolor=#d6d6d6
| 279961 ||  || — || September 20, 2001 || Socorro || LINEAR || — || align=right | 4.2 km || 
|-id=962 bgcolor=#fefefe
| 279962 ||  || — || September 20, 2001 || Socorro || LINEAR || V || align=right data-sort-value="0.82" | 820 m || 
|-id=963 bgcolor=#fefefe
| 279963 ||  || — || September 22, 2001 || Socorro || LINEAR || V || align=right data-sort-value="0.86" | 860 m || 
|-id=964 bgcolor=#fefefe
| 279964 ||  || — || September 17, 2001 || Socorro || LINEAR || FLO || align=right data-sort-value="0.86" | 860 m || 
|-id=965 bgcolor=#d6d6d6
| 279965 ||  || — || September 19, 2001 || Kitt Peak || Spacewatch || — || align=right | 4.3 km || 
|-id=966 bgcolor=#fefefe
| 279966 ||  || — || October 15, 2001 || Kleť || Kleť Obs. || — || align=right | 1.2 km || 
|-id=967 bgcolor=#fefefe
| 279967 ||  || — || October 12, 2001 || Ondřejov || P. Kušnirák || V || align=right data-sort-value="0.80" | 800 m || 
|-id=968 bgcolor=#fefefe
| 279968 ||  || — || October 14, 2001 || Socorro || LINEAR || FLO || align=right data-sort-value="0.80" | 800 m || 
|-id=969 bgcolor=#fefefe
| 279969 ||  || — || October 14, 2001 || Socorro || LINEAR || — || align=right | 1.4 km || 
|-id=970 bgcolor=#fefefe
| 279970 ||  || — || October 14, 2001 || Socorro || LINEAR || FLO || align=right data-sort-value="0.85" | 850 m || 
|-id=971 bgcolor=#fefefe
| 279971 ||  || — || October 15, 2001 || Socorro || LINEAR || — || align=right data-sort-value="0.82" | 820 m || 
|-id=972 bgcolor=#d6d6d6
| 279972 ||  || — || October 13, 2001 || Socorro || LINEAR || — || align=right | 5.7 km || 
|-id=973 bgcolor=#fefefe
| 279973 ||  || — || October 13, 2001 || Socorro || LINEAR || — || align=right | 1.1 km || 
|-id=974 bgcolor=#E9E9E9
| 279974 ||  || — || October 14, 2001 || Socorro || LINEAR || — || align=right | 2.6 km || 
|-id=975 bgcolor=#fefefe
| 279975 ||  || — || October 14, 2001 || Socorro || LINEAR || — || align=right | 1.2 km || 
|-id=976 bgcolor=#FA8072
| 279976 ||  || — || October 7, 2001 || Palomar || NEAT || — || align=right data-sort-value="0.75" | 750 m || 
|-id=977 bgcolor=#fefefe
| 279977 ||  || — || October 13, 2001 || Socorro || LINEAR || — || align=right | 1.1 km || 
|-id=978 bgcolor=#fefefe
| 279978 ||  || — || October 15, 2001 || Socorro || LINEAR || H || align=right data-sort-value="0.67" | 670 m || 
|-id=979 bgcolor=#fefefe
| 279979 ||  || — || October 13, 2001 || Palomar || NEAT || FLO || align=right | 1.0 km || 
|-id=980 bgcolor=#d6d6d6
| 279980 ||  || — || October 13, 2001 || Palomar || NEAT || — || align=right | 5.0 km || 
|-id=981 bgcolor=#fefefe
| 279981 ||  || — || October 15, 2001 || Socorro || LINEAR || PHO || align=right | 1.3 km || 
|-id=982 bgcolor=#d6d6d6
| 279982 ||  || — || October 15, 2001 || Palomar || NEAT || EUP || align=right | 5.2 km || 
|-id=983 bgcolor=#E9E9E9
| 279983 ||  || — || October 14, 2001 || Socorro || LINEAR || — || align=right | 2.3 km || 
|-id=984 bgcolor=#fefefe
| 279984 ||  || — || October 14, 2001 || Socorro || LINEAR || V || align=right data-sort-value="0.89" | 890 m || 
|-id=985 bgcolor=#fefefe
| 279985 ||  || — || October 15, 2001 || Desert Eagle || W. K. Y. Yeung || — || align=right data-sort-value="0.89" | 890 m || 
|-id=986 bgcolor=#fefefe
| 279986 ||  || — || October 8, 2001 || Palomar || NEAT || V || align=right data-sort-value="0.87" | 870 m || 
|-id=987 bgcolor=#d6d6d6
| 279987 ||  || — || October 25, 2001 || Desert Eagle || W. K. Y. Yeung || — || align=right | 4.7 km || 
|-id=988 bgcolor=#d6d6d6
| 279988 ||  || — || October 18, 2001 || Socorro || LINEAR || — || align=right | 4.2 km || 
|-id=989 bgcolor=#fefefe
| 279989 ||  || — || October 17, 2001 || Socorro || LINEAR || — || align=right | 1.7 km || 
|-id=990 bgcolor=#E9E9E9
| 279990 ||  || — || October 17, 2001 || Socorro || LINEAR || — || align=right | 1.9 km || 
|-id=991 bgcolor=#fefefe
| 279991 ||  || — || October 17, 2001 || Socorro || LINEAR || — || align=right | 1.2 km || 
|-id=992 bgcolor=#fefefe
| 279992 ||  || — || October 17, 2001 || Socorro || LINEAR || CIM || align=right | 3.7 km || 
|-id=993 bgcolor=#fefefe
| 279993 ||  || — || October 21, 2001 || Kitt Peak || Spacewatch || — || align=right data-sort-value="0.83" | 830 m || 
|-id=994 bgcolor=#fefefe
| 279994 ||  || — || October 19, 2001 || Palomar || NEAT || V || align=right | 1.1 km || 
|-id=995 bgcolor=#fefefe
| 279995 ||  || — || October 20, 2001 || Socorro || LINEAR || NYS || align=right data-sort-value="0.96" | 960 m || 
|-id=996 bgcolor=#d6d6d6
| 279996 ||  || — || October 20, 2001 || Socorro || LINEAR || — || align=right | 3.2 km || 
|-id=997 bgcolor=#fefefe
| 279997 ||  || — || October 20, 2001 || Socorro || LINEAR || EUT || align=right data-sort-value="0.79" | 790 m || 
|-id=998 bgcolor=#fefefe
| 279998 ||  || — || October 23, 2001 || Socorro || LINEAR || — || align=right | 1.2 km || 
|-id=999 bgcolor=#fefefe
| 279999 ||  || — || October 23, 2001 || Socorro || LINEAR || V || align=right data-sort-value="0.87" | 870 m || 
|-id=000 bgcolor=#E9E9E9
| 280000 ||  || — || October 23, 2001 || Socorro || LINEAR || — || align=right | 1.9 km || 
|}

References

External links 
 Discovery Circumstances: Numbered Minor Planets (275001)–(280000) (IAU Minor Planet Center)

0279